= George Berzsenyi =

Hungarian-American mathematician and educator (1938–2026)

- Berzsenyi in retirement, c. 2019
- Born: Vargha György; August 17, 1938; Budapest, Hungary
- Died: June 4, 2026 (aged 87)
- Occupations: Mathematician; mathematics educator
- Known for: Mathematics competitions and mentoring activities
- Awards: Paul Erdős Award (1996), Gung and Hu Award (2016)

George Berzsenyi (Hungarian pronunciation: [ˈbɛrʒɛɲi]; August 17, 1938 – June 4, 2026) was a Hungarian-American mathematician and professor, known for his contributions to mathematics education and his mentorship of high-school mathematics students. He founded and chaired the American Invitational Mathematics Examination (AIME), founded the United States of America Mathematical Talent Search (USAMTS), and helped create several other problem-solving programs for mathematically gifted students. For his contributions, he received the Paul Erdős Award in 1996 and the Gung and Hu Award in 2016.

== Early life and education ==
Berzsenyi was born in Budapest, Hungary, on August 17, 1938, as György de Vargha. Both parents came from old Hungarian nobility. His mother Kornélia descended from the poet Dániel Berzsenyi. György and his father, Colonel Miklós de Vargha, were among the many thousands who emigrated to the United States in 1957 after Soviet troops crushed the Hungarian Revolution of 1956.

György soon officially changed his name to George Berzsenyi. He earned his doctorate in mathematics from Texas Christian University in 1969, with a specialization in complex analysis.

== Academic career ==
Berzsenyi taught mathematics at Lamar University in Beaumont, Texas, for 19 years. He later joined Rose–Hulman Institute of Technology (RHIT) in Terre Haute, Indiana, where he continued to teach and promote mathematics enrichment for 12 years until his retirement in 1999.

== Competitions and outreach ==
=== Early competitions and ARML ===
At Lamar University, Berzsenyi organized an annual "Mathematics Day" from 1977 to 1982 for high-school students and created the Texas Mathematical Olympiad during this period. He also mentored students competing in the Westinghouse/Intel Science Talent Search and similar competitions. In 1980, he became the first coach of the Texas team for the American Regions Mathematics League (ARML). The team won its first ARML championship on May 30, 2026, days before Berzsenyi's death.

=== AIME and AMC involvement ===
In 1983, Berzsenyi became the founding chair of the American Invitational Mathematics Examination (AIME) committee and served for six years. He also contributed problems to the American Mathematics Competitions (AMC), including the earlier American High School Mathematics Examination (AHSME). These annual exams are part of the selection process for the USA Mathematical Olympiad, leading in turn to the International Mathematical Olympiad.

=== USAMTS and other proof-by-mail programs ===
Berzsenyi edited "The Competition Corner" in The Mathematics Student from 1978 until the journal ended in 1981. He modeled this column on the Hungarian journal Középiskolai Matematikai Lapok (KöMaL), providing extended time for problem-solving proofs that high-school students nationwide would submit by mail for scoring and personalized feedback.

"The Competition Corner" and its successors evolved into the USA Mathematical Talent Search (USAMTS), which Berzsenyi founded in 1989. He directed the contest through the 1990s and later co-edited problem sets for the International Mathematical Talent Search (IMTS).

For much of the 1990s, he invited about 30 of the strongest USAMTS solvers to spend three weeks at the NSF-funded Young Scholars Program at Rose–Hulman, where they studied topics ranging from classical geometry to chaos theory.

== Death and legacy ==
Berzsenyi died June 4, 2026, at the age of 87. He was survived by his wife Kay after 61 years of marriage, and by their children and grandchildren.

His mathematical protégés include numerous academics and scientists. Among them are Noam Elkies, Kiran Kedlaya, and Vamsi Mootha, who credited Berzsenyi's mentorship in an NPR feature.

== Recognition ==
In 1996, Berzsenyi received the Paul Erdős Award from the World Federation of National Mathematics Competitions for his contributions to national competitions and educational enrichment. In 2016, he received the Gung and Hu Award from the Mathematical Association of America for a lifetime of distinguished service.

== Selected publications ==
- The Contest Problem Book V: American High School Mathematics Examinations and American Invitational Mathematics Examinations 1983–1988 (Mathematical Association of America, 1997, with Stephen B. Maurer) ISBN 978-0883856406
- International Mathematical Talent Search, Parts 1–2 (Australian Mathematics Trust, 2010–2011)
- The Competition Corner in The Mathematics Student: Its History, Problems, Solutions, and the People Involved (self-published 2021, with István Laukó and Gabriella Pintér) ISBN 979-8524664495
- Tata's Tattered Tales, a three-volume genealogical memoir (self-published 2022–2023) ASIN B0BX4LM7NW
