= Berzsenyi =

Berzsenyi is a surname. Notable people with the surname include:

- Barnabás Berzsenyi (1918–1993), Hungarian fencer
- Dániel Berzsenyi (1776–1836), Hungarian poet
- George Berzsenyi (born 1938), Hungarian-American mathematician
- Mária Berzsenyi (born 1946), Hungarian handball goalkeeper
- Ralph Berzsenyi (1909–1978), Hungarian sport shooter
