= Sedrakyan =

Sedrakyan (Armenian: Սեդրակյան) is an Armenian surname. Notable people with the surname include:

- Nairi Sedrakyan (born 1961), Armenian mathematician
- Sedrak A. Sedrakyan (born 1950), Armenian psychologist
- Vardan Sedrakyan (born 1967), Armenian epic poetry expert
