= Titu (disambiguation) =

Titu is a town in Romania.

Titu may also refer to:

- Titu (name), including a list of people with the surname and given name
- Titu-ye Pain, Iran

== See also ==
- Titus (disambiguation)
- Titu Maiorescu University in Bucharest, Romania
