= Paul Erdős Award =

Bi-annual mathematics award

- Description: Playing a significant role in the development of mathematical challenges and enrichment of mathematics learning
- Location: International
- Presented by: World Federation of National Mathematics Competitions (WFNMC)
- Rewards: Medal and a citation
- Status: Active
- Website: www.wfnmc.org/awards.html

The Paul Erdős Award, named after Paul Erdős, is given by the World Federation of National Mathematics Competitions (WFNMC) for those who "have played a significant role in the development of mathematical challenges at the national or international level and which have been a stimulus for the enrichment of mathematics learning". The awards have been given in two-year periods since 1992.

== Awardees ==
- 1992:
  - Luis Davidson, Cuba
  - Nikolay Konstantinov, Russia
  - John Webb, South Africa
- 1994:
  - Ronald Dunkley, Canada
  - Walter Mientka, USA
  - Urgengtserengiin Sanjmyatav, Mongolia
  - Jordan Tabov, Bulgaria
  - Peter Taylor, Australia
  - Qiu Zonghu, People's Republic of China
- 1996:
  - George Berzsenyi, USA
  - Tony Gardiner, United Kingdom
  - Derek Holton, New Zealand
- 1998:
  - Agnis Andzans, Latvia
  - Wolfgang Engel, Germany
  - Mark Saul, USA
- 2000:
  - Francisco Bellot Rosado, Spain
  - István Reiman, Hungary
  - János Surányi, Hungary
- 2002:
  - Bogoljub Marinkovic, Yugoslavia
  - Harold Braun Reiter, United States of America
  - Wen-Hsien Sun, Taiwan
- 2004:
  - Warren Atkins, Australia
  - André Deledicq, France
  - Patricia Fauring, Argentina
- 2006:
  - Simon Chua, Philippines
  - Ali Rejali, Iran
  - Alexander Soifer, USA
- 2008:
  - Hans-Dietrich (Dieter) Gronau, Germany
  - Bruce Henry, Australia
  - Leou Shian, Taiwan
- 2010:
  - Rafael Sanchez-Lamoneda, Venezuela
  - Yahya Tabesh, Iran
- 2012:
  - Cecil C. Rousseau, USA
  - Paul Vaderlind, Sweden
- 2014:
  - Petar Kenderov, Bulgaria
  - József Pelikán, Hungary
  - Richard Rusczyk, USA
- 2016:
  - Luis Caceres, Puerto Rico
  - David Christopher Hunt, Australia
  - Kar-Ping Shum, Hong Kong, China
- 2018:
  - Bin Xiong, China
  - David Monk, United Kingdom
  - Carlos Gustavo Tamm de Araujo Moreira, Brazil
- 2020:
  - Gangsong Leng, China
  - Jaromir Simsa, Czech Republic
  - Jaroslav Švrček, Czech Republic
- 2022:
  - Géza Kós, Hungary
  - Sergey Rukshin, Russia
  - Nairi Sedrakyan, Armenia
- 2024:
  - Angelo Di Pasquale, Australia
  - Matjaz Zeljko, Slovenia
- 2026:
  - Sándor Róka, Hungary
  - Michał Krych, Poland
  - Edmilson Motta, Brazil

== See also ==
- List of mathematics awards

== Sources ==
- Homepage of the award.
