= Titu (name) =

Titu is a given name and surname. Notable people with the name include:

== Given name ==
- Titu Andreescu (born 1956), Romanian mathematician
  - Titu's lemma
- Titu Cusi (1529–1571), Inca emperor
- Titu Maiorescu (1840–1917), Romanian literary critic and politician
  - Titu Maiorescu University

== Surname ==
- Gheorghe Titu (fl. 1970s to mid-1980s), Romanian canoeist

== Nickname ==
- Ahasanul Islam Titu (born 1969), Bangladesh politician
- Saiful Bari Titu (born 1969), Bangladeshi football coach and former player
- Firoj Mahmud Titu (born 1974), Bangladeshi footballer
- Ekramul Haque Titu (born 1976), Bangladeshi politician
