= United States of America Mathematical Talent Search =

Mathematics competition in the U.S.

The United States of America Mathematical Talent Search (USAMTS) is a proof-based mathematics competition open to all United States students in or below high school.

== History ==
Professor George Berzsenyi initiated the contest in 1989 under the KöMaL model and under joint sponsorship of the Rose–Hulman Institute of Technology and the Consortium for Mathematics and its Applications.

There were 718 participants in the 2004–2005 school year, with an average score of 49.25 out of 100.

Up until the 2024-2025 competition season, people who scored above a 68 on the USAMTS could have qualified for the USA(J)MO by scoring at least an 11 on the AIME for the USAMO (9-10 for the USAJMO).

As of 2021, the USAMTS is sponsored by the National Security Agency and administered by the Art of Problem Solving foundation.

== Format ==
The competition is proof and research based. Students submit proofs within the round's timeframe (usually a month), and return solutions by mail or upload their solutions in a PDF file through the USAMTS website. During this time, students are free to use any mathematical resources that are available, so long as it is not the help of another person. Carefully written justifications are required for each problem.

Prior to academic year 2010–2011 the competition consisted of four rounds of five problems each, covering all non-calculus topics. Students were given approximately one month to solve the questions. Each question is scored out of five points; thus, a perfect score is $100$.

In the academic year 2010–2011, the USAMTS briefly changed their format to two rounds of six problems each, and approximately six weeks are allotted for each round.

The current format consists of three problem sets, each five problems and lasting about a month each. Every question is still worth 5 points, making a perfect score $75$.

== Scoring ==
Every problem on the USAMTS is graded on a scale of 0 to 5, where a 0 is an answer that is highly flawed or incomplete and a 5 is a rigorous and well-written proof. As a result, possible scores over the three rounds range from 0 to 75. The solutions are graded every year by a volunteer group of university students and other people with professional mathematical experience. In addition to their scores, students receive detailed feedback on how they could improve their solutions if they attempt a problem but do not achieve full marks.

== Historic score distribution ==
Year	Participating Students	Average score
2025–2026	926	56.36
2024–2025	941	58.67
2023–2024	555	51.18
2022–2023	273	53.63
2021–2022	368	56.06
2020–2021	653	52.3
2019–2020	488	55.39
2018–2019	614	51.44
2017–2018	605	51.91
2016–2017	686	50.48
2015–2016	490	52.15
2014–2015	739	50.72
2013–2014	393	54.03
2012–2013	481	54
2011–2012	453	50.49
2010–2011	415	37.21
2009–2010	667	67.44
2008-2009	527	72.42
2007-2008	568	77.03
2006–2007	586	74.6

== Prizes ==
Prizes are given to all contestants who place within a certain range. These prizes include a shirt from AoPS, software, and one or two mathematical books of varying difficulty. Prizes are also awarded to students with outstanding solutions in individual rounds. Further, after the third round, a student may qualify to take the AIME exam even without qualifying through the AMC 10 or 12 competitions if their score is at least a 68 out of 75. As of the 2025-2026 competition season, the USAMTS offers 15 spots for the USAMO and 10 spots for the USAJMO with priority of their AIME Score to their USAMTS score.
