= László Rátz =

Hungarian mathematics teacher

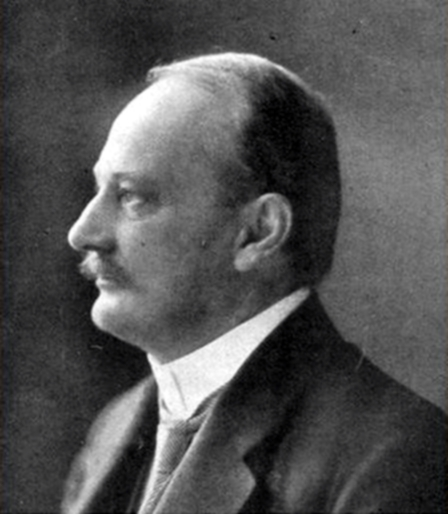
László Rátz (1863–1930), mathematics high school teacher in "Budapest-Fasori Evangélikus Gimnázium" during the years from 1890 to his retirement in 1925.

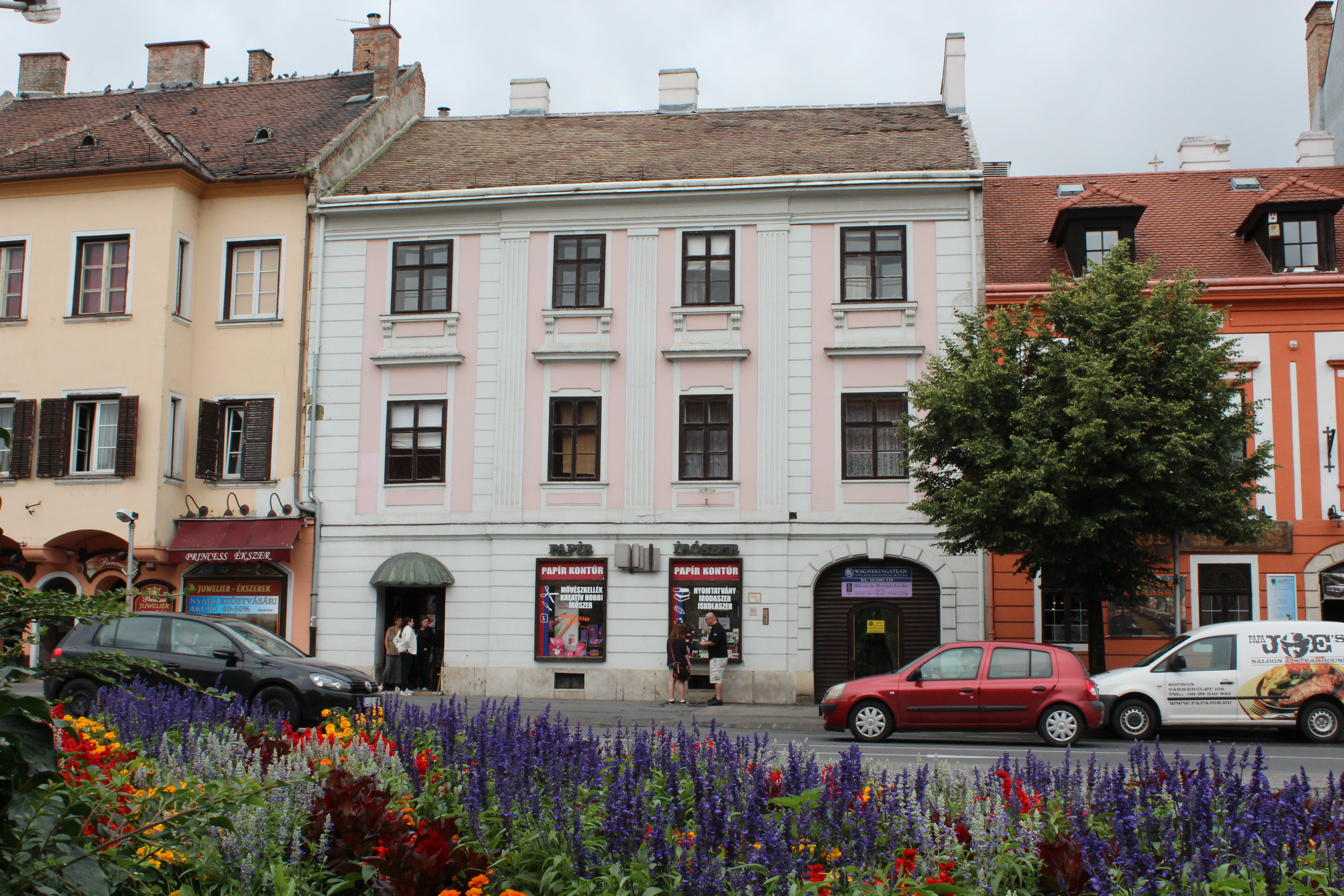
Birthplace of László Rátz in Sopron, Hungary.

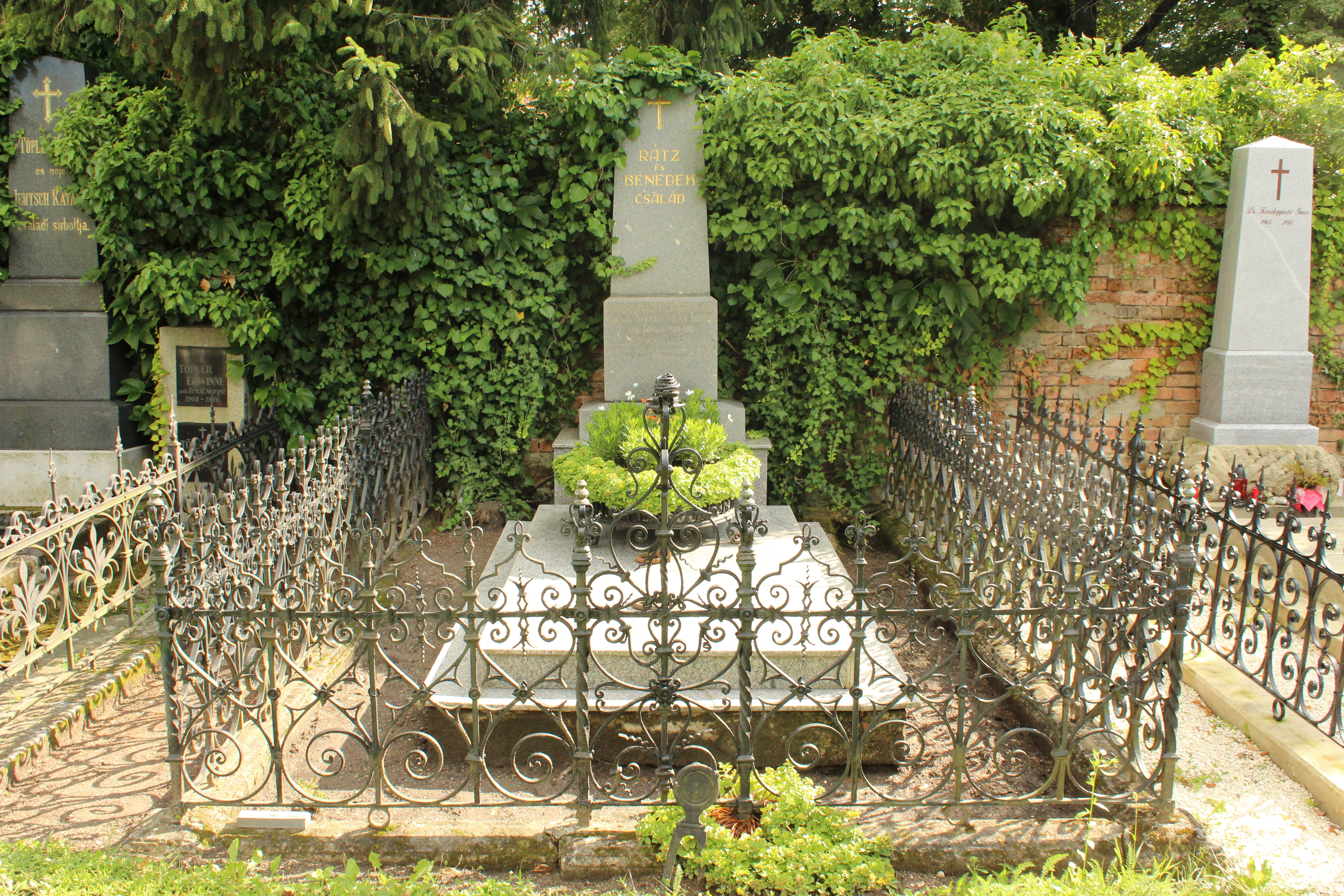
Tomb of László Rátz in Sopron, Hungary.

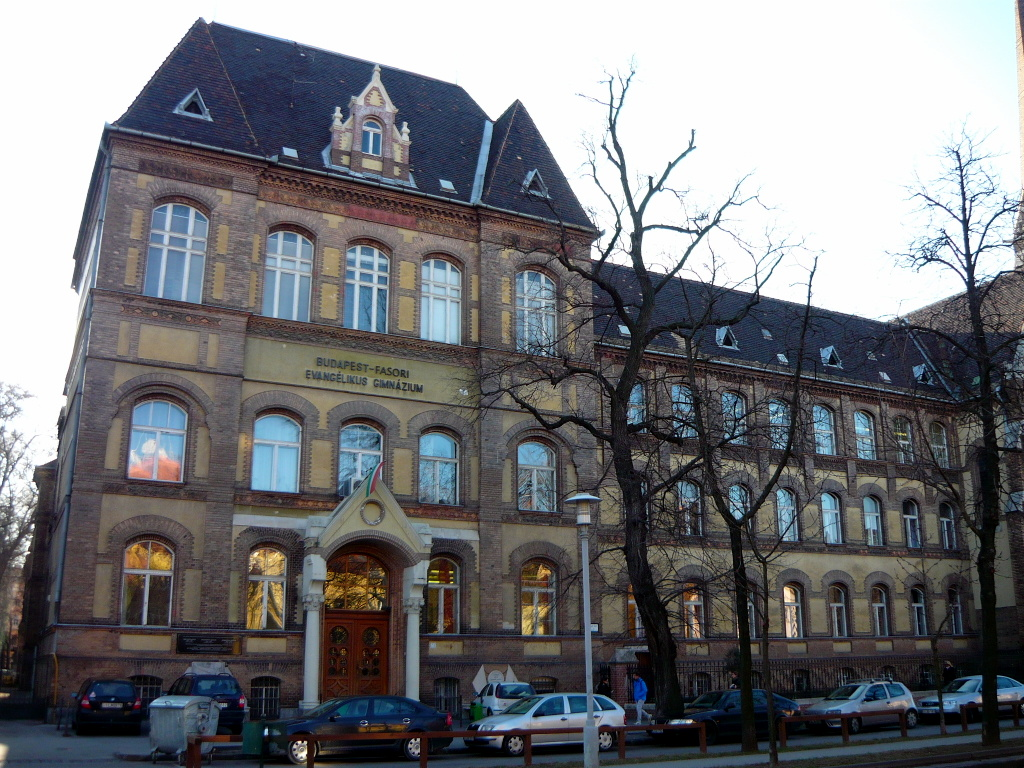
Budapest-Fasori Evangélikus Gimnázium, Városligeti Fasor 17–21, Budapest.

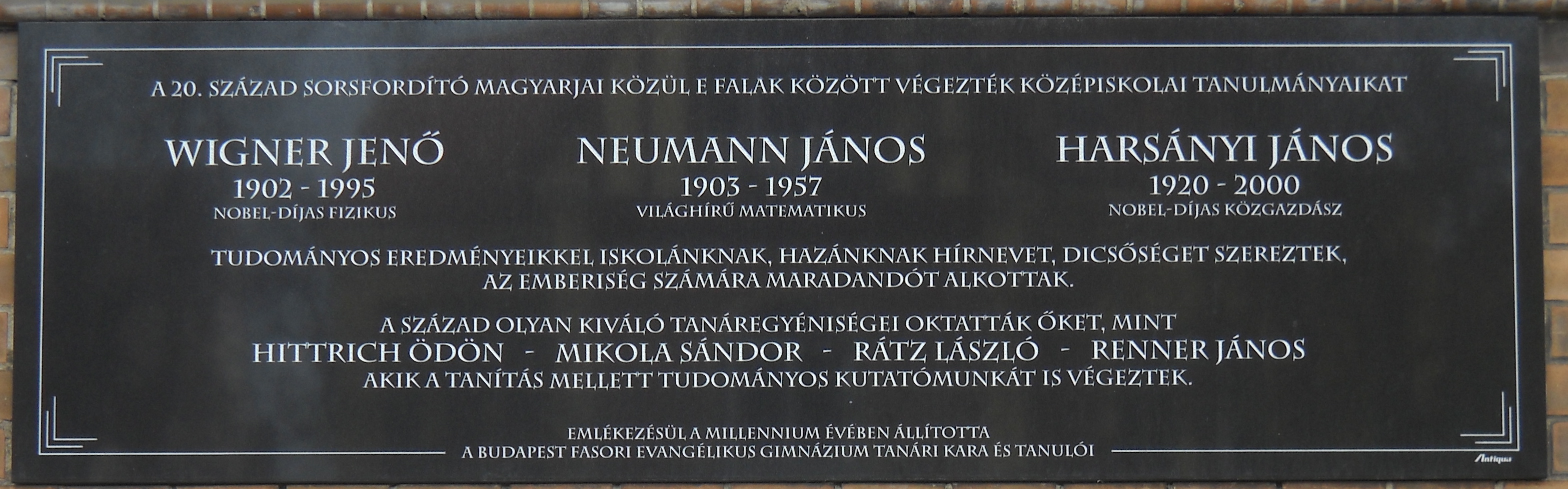
"Budapest-Fasori Evangélikus Gimnázium", Commemorative plaque of Jenő Wigner, János Neumann and János Harsányi, Budapest District VII, Városligeti Alley No 17–21. Also with the names of four of the teachers of Fasori Gimnázium, Ödön Hittrich, Sándor Mikola, László Rátz and János Renner.

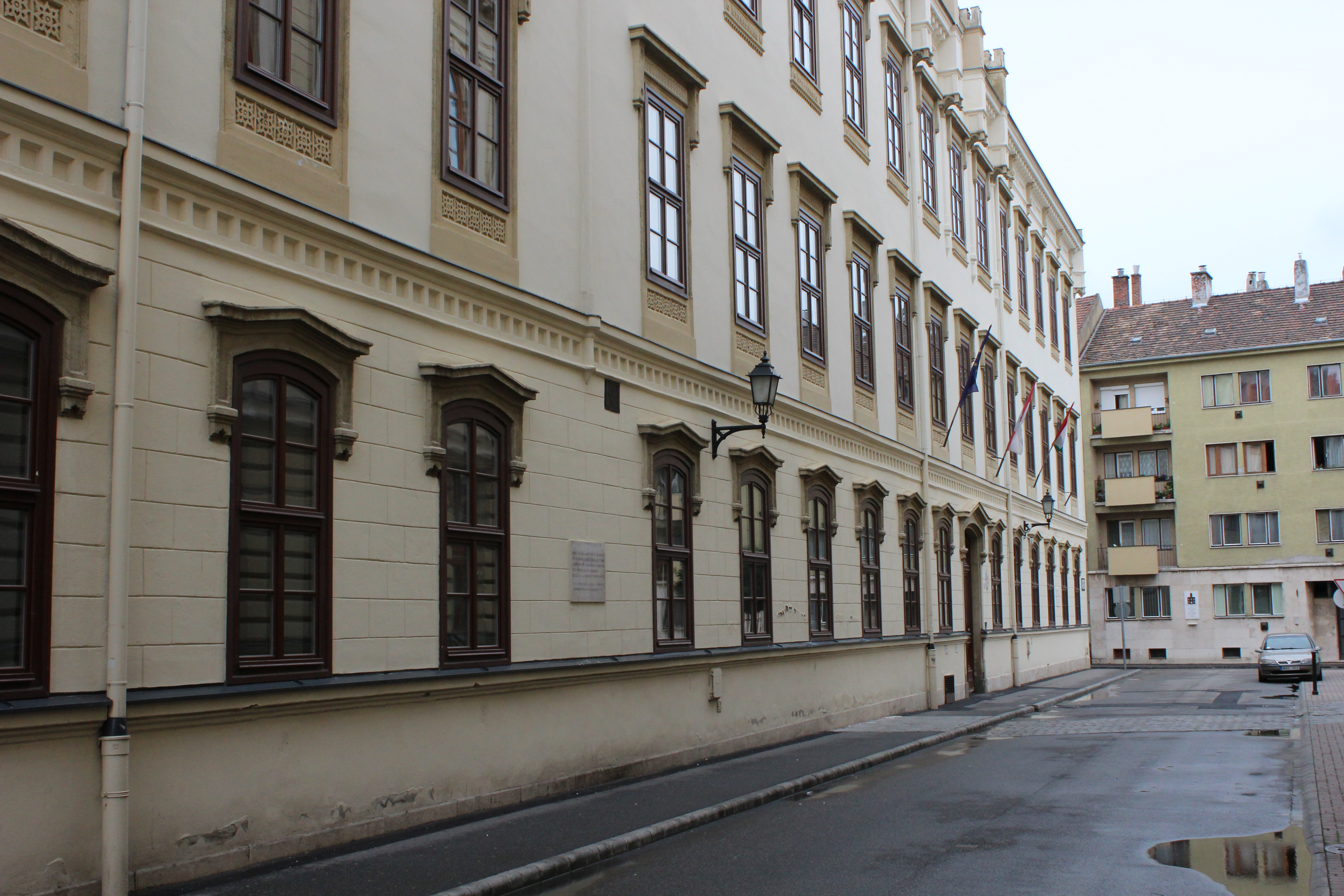
The "Főreáliskola in Sopron" in Sopron, where László Rátz studied. The school of Franz Liszt street frontage Salamin Leó memorial plaque (now Széchenyi István Gimnázium (Sopron)).

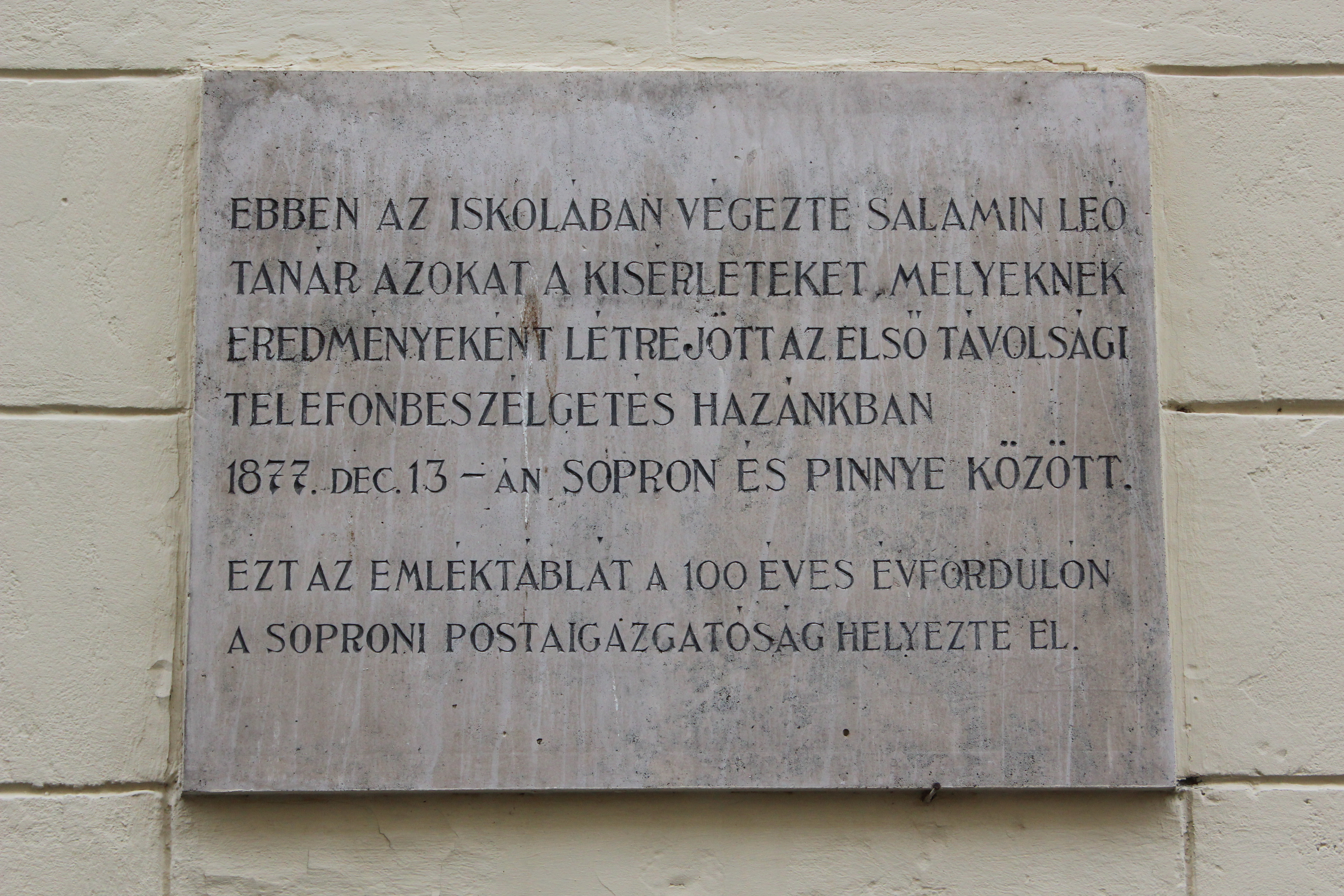
Commemorative plaque of Leó Salamin in Széchenyi István Gimnázium (Sopron). Leó Salamin taught the French language and he was in the institution's Board of Director and was the high school director during the years 1872–1897. László Rátz had five years of being taught the French language by Leó Salamin.

László Rátz (9 April 1863 in Sopron – 30 September 1930 in Budapest) was a Hungarian mathematics high school teacher best known for educating such people as John von Neumann and Nobel laureate Eugene Wigner. He was a legendary teacher of "Budapest-Fasori Evangélikus Gimnázium", the Budapest Lutheran Gymnasium, a famous secondary school in Budapest in Hungary.

== Biography ==
He was born on 9 April 1863 in Sopron, a city in Hungary on the Austrian border, near the Lake Neusiedl/Lake Fertő. His father, Ágost Rátz, was a hardware merchant and ironmonger, and his mother was Emma Töpler of Danube Swabian origin. He graduated from the Lutheran Grammar School of Sopron in 1882.

The courses of study for elementary and middle school the first two years are not available. He was a student in the Hungarian royal state grammar school, "Főreáliskola in Sopron" between 1875 and 1880, now Széchenyi István Gimnázium (Sopron). From 1880 to 1882 he studied at the Sopron Lutheran High School and graduated in 1882. From 1883 to 1887 he was a student at the University of Budapest.

Then he attended the Science University of Budapest from 1883 to 1887. His university studies were at the Academy of Science in Budapest until 1887. He also studied philosophy at Berlin University between 4 October 1887 and 7 August 1888, and natural science at Strasbourg University from 31 October 1888. He worked as a practicing teacher in the Main Practising Secondary School of Budapest Science University from September 1889. He took his university degree specializing in mathematics and physics on 28 November 1890.

From 1890 he was a mathematics professor at the "Budapest-Fasori Evangélikus Gimnázium", a German-speaking Lutheran High School in Városligeti fasor 17–21 in Budapest. Beginning 1 September 1890 he was employed as a substitute teacher. From 1 September 1892 until 1925, he tenured as a regular teacher.

From 1909 to 1914, he served as director of the Gimnázium. One of his successors in this role was Sándor Mikola, who was school principal from 1928 to 1935.

Between the years of 1912–1921, he taught several students who became excellent mathematicians, physicians and chemists, including Nobel prize-winning physicist Eugene Wigner (Jenő Wigner) and mathematician and polymath John von Neumann (János Neumann). At the age of 11, Eugene Wigner developed an interest in mathematical problems. From 1915 through 1919 Wigner studied at the Gimnázium, where he and Von Neumann were taught by Rátz. von Neumann entered the Gimnázium in 1911. Although his father insisted he attend school at the grade level appropriate to his age, he agreed to hire private tutors to give him advanced instruction in those areas in which he had displayed an aptitude.

Lászlo Rátz died on 30 September 1930 in Grünwald Sanatorium, a nursing home, in Budapest.

== Commemorative plaque ==
An embossed marble tablet commemorates him on the wall of Budapest Lutheran Gymnasium, Budapest-Fasori Evangélikus Gimnázium. The commemorative plaque of Jenő Wigner, János Neumann and János Harsányi, Budapest District VII, Városligeti Alley No 17–21, has also the names of four of the teachers of Fasori Gimnázium, Ödön Hittrich, Sándor Mikola, László Rátz and János Renner.

== Mathematics curriculum ==
László Rátz participated in the making of the mathematics curriculum of 1924 as well as the relevant instructions. While an active teacher, he was also the teacher-chairperson of Song and Music Association. After retirement he became the executive president of Former Students Association. His scientific career is significant for two reasons: on the one hand, he was a pioneer in completing the reform of teaching mathematics in secondary schools (1905–1914), and, on the other hand, he was the editor of the Journal of Secondary School Mathematics from 1896 to 1914 after Dániel Arany (1863–1945).

== Editor-in-chief ==
Between 1894 and 1914 Rátz was editor-in-chief (Editorial Head) of the Középiskolai Matematikai és Fizikai Lapok, KöMaL, Mathematic and Physical Journal for Secondary Schools, the legendary highschool mathematics journal of Hungary. The archives of the High School Mathematics and Physics Journal, known as KöMaL, a popular abbreviation of the Hungarian name "Középiskolai Matematikai és Fizikai Lapok", is a Hungarian mathematics and physics journal for high school students, which has been continually published since 1894. The journal has published mathematical problems and articles for more than a century and has played an important role in Hungarian mathematics education. Originally devoted to mathematics, it later expanded to include physics. Founded in 1894 by Dániel Arany, it was edited by him until 1896, when László Rátz succeeded him and remained editor until 1914. The journal's numbered problems ("Feladat") were intended primarily for students in the final two years of secondary school.

== János Bolyai Mathematical Society ==
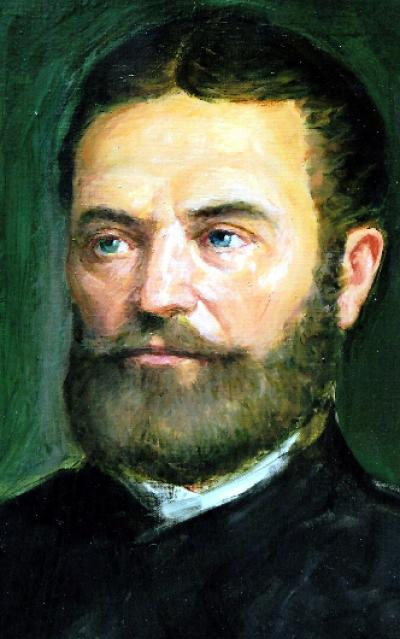
János Bolyai (1802–1860), painted by Ferenc Márkos (2012).

The János Bolyai Mathematical Society (Bolyai János Matematikai Társulat, BJMT) is the Hungarian mathematical society, named after János Bolyai, a 19th-century Hungarian mathematician, a co-discoverer of non-Euclidean geometry. It is the professional society of the Hungarian mathematicians, applied mathematicians, and mathematics teachers. It was founded in 1947, as one of the two successor societies of the Mathematical and Physical Society ("Bolyai János Matematikai és Fizikai Társulat") founded in 1891. It is a member-society of the European Mathematical Society. The European Mathematical Society (EMS) is a European organization dedicated to the development of mathematics in Europe. Its members are different mathematical societies in Europe, academic institutions and individual mathematicians. The current president is Marta Sanz Solé, professor of statistics at University of Barcelona. Some of the Presidents of the Society were György Hajós (1963–1972), László Fejes Tóth (1972–1975), Pál Turán (1975–1976) and János Surányi (1976–1980), the names of some of them are below under Középiskolai Matematikai és Fizikai Lapok, KöMaL.

János Bolyai Mathematical Society organizes László Rátz Congress for secondary school mathematics teachers every year and has issued the László Rátz coin since 2000. The High School Mathematics Journal was published by the János Bolyai Mathematical Society and the publication was financed by the Ministry of Education.

- János Bolyai (15 December 1802 – 27 January 1860) Hungarian: Bolyai János, was a Hungarian mathematician, one of the founders of non-Euclidean geometry — a geometry that differs from Euclidean geometry in its definition of parallel lines. The discovery of a consistent alternative geometry that might correspond to the structure of the universe helped to free mathematicians to study abstract concepts irrespective of any possible connection with the physical world. Bolyai was born in the town of Kolozsvár (Klausenburg), Principality of Transylvania (now Cluj-Napoca in Romania), the son of Zsuzsanna Benkő and the well-known mathematician Farkas Bolyai. He died in Marosvásárhely, Transylvania, Austrian Empire (now Târgu Mureş, Romania).

== Középiskolai Matematikai és Fizikai Lapok, KöMaL ==
Középiskolai Matematikai és Fizikai Lapok, KöMaL, Mathematic and Physical Journal for Secondary Schools, the legendary highschool mathematics journal of Hungary.

Some of the best contestants were

- János Harsányi (John Harsányi) (1920–2000) (Hungarian: Harsányi János Károly), was born in Budapest. As he attended high school at the Lutheran Gymnasium in Budapest, there is on the marble tablet in Fasori Gimnázium also János Harsányi's name. During high school he became one of the best problem solvers of the KöMaL, the Mathematical and Physical Monthly for Secondary Schools. Founded in 1893, this periodical is generally credited with a large share of Hungarian students' success in mathematics. He also won the first prize in the Eötvös mathematics competition for high school students.

John Harsányi became a Hungarian-American economist and Nobel Memorial Prize in Economic Sciences winner in 1994. He is best known for his contributions to the study of game theory and its application to economics, specifically for his developing the highly innovative analysis of games of incomplete information, so-called Bayesian games. For his work, important contributions to the use of game theory and economic reasoning in political and moral philosophy (specifically utilitarian ethics, he was a co-recipient along with John Nash and Reinhard Selten of the 1994 Nobel Memorial Prize in Economics. He died in Berkeley, California, USA.

- Pál Erdős (Paul Erdős) (1913–1996) (Hungarian: Erdős Pál), was born in Budapest, he became a mathematician, he lived in the United States, United Kingdom, Israel, but died in Warsaw, Poland. His fascination with mathematics developed early—at the age of four, he could calculate in his head how many seconds a person had lived, given their age. At 16, his father introduced him to two of his lifetime favorite subjects—infinite series and set theory. During high school, Erdős became an ardent solver of the problems proposed each month in KöMaL, the Mathematical and Physical Monthly for Secondary Schools. Erdős later published several articles in it about problems in elementary plane geometry. In 1934, at the age of 21, he was awarded a doctorate in mathematics. He died in Warszaw, Poland.
- Pál Turán (Paul Turán) (1910–1976) (Hungarian: Turán Pál), was born in Budapest, he became a Hungarian a mathematician and worked primarily in number theory. He had a long collaboration with fellow Hungarian mathematician Paul Erdős, lasting 46 years and resulting in 28 joint papers. He received a teaching degree at the University of Budapest in 1933 and the Ph.D. degree under Lipót Fejér in 1935. He became associate professor at the University of Budapest in 1945 and full professor in 1949. He died in Budapest.
- György Hajós (1912–1972) (Hungarian: Hajós György), was born in Budapest, he became a Hungarian mathematician who worked in group theory, graph theory, and geometry. In graph theory, a branch of mathematics, the Hajós construction is an operation on graphs named after György Hajós (1961), that may be used to construct any critical graph or any graph whose chromatic number is at least some given threshold. He earned a teaching degree from the University of Budapest in 1935. He then took a position at the Technical University of Budapest, where he stayed from 1935 to 1949. While at the Technical University of Budapest, he earned a doctorate in 1938. He became a professor at the Eötvös Loránd University in 1949 and remained there until his death in 1972. Additionally he was president of the János Bolyai Mathematical Society from 1963 to 1972. He died in Budapest.
- Eszter Klein (Esther Szekeres) (1910–2005) (Hungarian: Klein Eszter, married Esther Szekeres), was born in Budapest, she became a Hungarian-Australian mathematician with an Erdős number of 1. The Erdős number describes the "collaborative distance" between mathematician Paul Erdős and another person, as measured by authorship of mathematical papers. Esther Klein was a member of a high school student in mathematics who are interested in associating Anonymous group in Budapest, Pál Erdős (Paul Erdős) (Hungarian: Erdős Pál), Pál Turán (Paul Turán) (Hungarian: Turán Pál), György Szekeres (George Szekeres) (Hungarian: Szekeres György) and with others. In 1936 she married George Szekeres and later moved to Adelaide and Sydney. She died in Adelaide in Australia.
- Tibor Bakos (1909–1998) (Hungarian: Bakos Tibor), was born in Szeged, he became a mathematics teacher and he had specialized methods in teaching, he was an excellent expert in mathematics teaching methodology. He graduated the main secondary school in Szombathely in 1927, higher education in the Peter Pázmány University in mathematics and physics department, was admitted to the Eötvös College. They were masters of the faculty of Fejér and Joseph Kürschák. Teaching career began in Satoraljaujhely, assistant teaching position was a pious teacher of real estates high school. Bakos did well in mathematics teaching methodology, which is why in 1958, in Budapest the mathematician János Surányi called him to edit the Problems with KöMaL. He was one of the responsible editor of the High School Math Sheets (1958–1974), until his retirement. He died in Budapest.
- János Surányi (1918–2006) (Hungarian: Surányi János), was born in Budapest, he became Ph.D. in 1941 and professor at University of Szeged. Erdös Award. Professor János Surányi received his undergraduate degree in 1941 and his Ph.D. in 1943. He began teaching at University of Szeged as an assistant in 1950 without pay. Since 1950 he has worked at Eötvös University Budapest, and since 1960 he has held the rank of full professor. The journal has been a very important factor in the popularization of mathematics, in particular of solving mathematical problems by high school students. János Surányi has served as editor-in-chief since 1970. He had significant educational, didactic and talent management activities. In 1947 Paula Soós restarted the Middle School Math Sheets and a major part of the János Bolyai Mathematical Society was created. He died in Budapest.

== The reformer of teaching mathematics ==
The reform committee of mathematics declared at the Meran general assembly of nature examiners in Germany in 1905 that sciences also represent cultural values, not only practical benefits: therefore, they are worth being considered equal to linguistics as means of education. In Hungary the reform was conducted by Prof. Manó Beke. He, together with Gusztáv Rados and László Rátz, represented Hungary in the international reform committee from 1909. László Rátz participated in congresses organized in Cambridge and Paris. He was granted the French Officer d'Académie in 1910. In 1906 the Mathematics Reform Committee was established in Hungary, the chairperson of which was Manó Beke, its secretary was Sándor Mikola and the members included László Rátz as well. This committee performed admittedly the most productive work among the European committees. László Rátz and Sándor Mikola, as they found the changes necessary, had worked out the workable methods and curriculum of mathematics teaching. They declared that certain elements that are obtained indirectly belong to mathematics as well and they have to be confirmed in the student. The learning of mathematics has to be completed by immediate experience and lots of measuring. They also emphasized the need for mental calculation and the practice of estimating. According to their theory the students have to be encouraged to tend to know reality. They considered inevitable for the teachers to intend to form clear ideas. Finally, their brave initiatives were successful: in November 1909 Rátz and Mikola were officially permitted to teach mathematics in the Lutheran Gymnasium as they found it desirable in accordance with the reform endeavours.

From the beginning he was an active participant in a worldwide effort of science and mathematics teaching education reform; from 1909 he gets official full liberty in improving educational methods in his own high school; he becomes Officier d'Académie award at a 1910 Paris congress. The objectives of this reform were the recognition of cultural and humane values of science education, besides tangible pragmatic values. According to the objectives, mathematics has important involuntarily acquirable subconscious elements that need to be enhanced in students. The teachers strived to deliver clearly articulated concepts at the voluntary, conscious level, but more importantly, learning of mathematics has to be tightly woven together with direct experience and practice, emphasizing mental calculations and practicing estimations, allowing students to acquire a subconscious knowledge of reality from experience with quantitative relations.

== Eugene Wigner about his teacher László Rátz ==
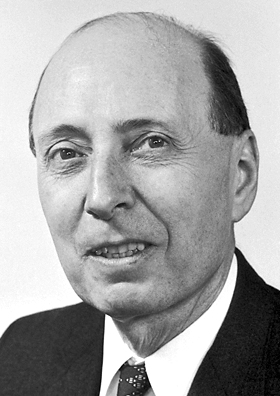
Eugene Paul Wigner (1902–1995) in 1963, when he was awarded his Nobel Prize in Physics. Author: Nobel foundation.

Eugene Wigner kept a photo of Ratz in his workroom.

During the years 1912–1920 Eugene Wigner was taught by László Rátz and in his acceptance speech for his Nobel Prize (in 1963), Dr. Eugene Wigner said:

... there were many superb teachers at the Lutheran gymnasium. But the greatest was my mathematics teacher László Rátz. Rátz was known not only throughout our gymnasium but also by the church and government hierarchy and among many of the teachers in the country schools. I still keep a photograph of Rátz in my workroom because he had every quality of a miraculous teacher: He loved teaching. He knew the subject and how to kindle interest in it. He imparted the very deepest understanding. Many gymnasium teachers had great skill, but no one could evoke the beauty of the subject like Rátz. Rátz cared deeply about mathematics as a discipline...

He took special care to find his better students and to inspire them. Rátz felt so privileged to tutor a phenomenon like Neumann Jancsi that he refused any money for it...

Who could know that this precocious 10-year-old would someday become a great mathematician? Somehow Rátz knew. And he discovered it very quickly. Rátz was just as nice to me and nearly as devoted as he was to Neumann. Rátz was the only gymnasium teacher to invite me into his home. There were no private lessons. But Rátz lent me many well-chosen books, which I read thoroughly and made sure to return in good condition.

== Sources ==
- Hungarian traditions in talent support, European Day of the Talented and Gifted, Spring 2011. Source: László Kovács.
- Rátz László, VersenyVizsaga (Hungarian).
