= Titu Andreescu =

Romanian-American mathematician

- Born: Titu Andreescu; 19 August 1956 (age 70); Timișoara, People's Republic of Romania
- Education: University of Timișoara
- Scientific career
- Fields: Mathematics
- Workplaces: University of Texas at Dallas
- Thesis: Research on Diophantine Analysis and Applications (2003)
- Doctoral advisor: Mihail Megan

Titu Andreescu (born August 19, 1956) is an associate professor of mathematics at the University of Texas at Dallas. He is firmly involved in mathematics contests and olympiads, having been the Director of American Mathematics Competitions (as appointed by the Mathematical Association of America), Director of the Mathematical Olympiad Program, Head Coach of the United States International Mathematical Olympiad Team, and Chairman of the United States of America Mathematical Olympiad. He has also authored a large number of books on the topic of problem solving and olympiad-style mathematics.

== Biography ==
Andreescu was born in the Romanian city of Timișoara in 1956. From an early age, an interest in higher-level mathematics was encouraged by his father and by his uncle Andrew, who was a retired university professor. As a high school student, he excelled in mathematics, and in 1973, 1974, and 1975 won the Romanian national problem solving contests organized by the journal Gazeta Matematică. After graduating with a B.S. degree from the University of Timișoara, Andreescu was appointed a professor of mathematics at the Constantin Diaconovici Loga school of Mathematics and Physics. Between the years 1981–1989 he also worked as the editor-in-chief of the Periodical Revista matematică din Timișoara. In 1990, as the Eastern Bloc began to collapse, Andreescu emigrated to the United States, where he first taught at the Illinois Mathematics and Science Academy. He earned a Ph.D. degree from the University of Timișoara in 2003.

== Mathematics coaching and contests ==
During the 1980s, Andreescu served as a coach for the Romanian International Mathematical Olympiad (IMO) team and in 1983 was presented with the national award of "Distinguished Professor". In 1984 he was appointed as "Counselor of the Romanian Ministry of Education". After emigrating to the United States, Andreescu became involved in coaching the American IMO team. His most notable success came in 1994 when the American team obtained a perfect score at the Hong Kong International Mathematical Olympiad, the first time that any team had achieved this. In recognition of this achievement, he was awarded a Certificate of Appreciation from the Mathematical Association of America for "outstanding service" as coach of the United States Mathematical Olympiad Program.

== AwesomeMath Program ==
In 2006, Andreescu established a math camp for bright and motivated middle and high school mathematicians. The first AwesomeMath summer program was very effective, with noted professors serving as instructors, and mentors and assistants who had performed well at Olympiads. The program has now been expanded to include locations at the University of Puget Sound (formerly at the University of California, Berkeley) and Cornell University, as well as the original location at the University of Texas at Dallas. The program continues throughout the year as the related AwesomeMath Year-round program, or AMY.

== Metroplex Math Circle ==
In 2006, Andreescu founded a mathematical circle hosted by the University of Texas at Dallas. This circle continues to thrive under his leadership, serving the needs of talented middle and high school students in north Texas. Speakers come from around the world and the local community of professors and their most skilled graduate students. Notable participants in the Metroplex Math Circle include Amy Chyao, Michael Ma, and Niranjan Balachandar.

== Math Rocks! Program ==
In 2008, the Plano Independent School District in Plano, Texas launched a Math Rocks! program, a program for kids with very high-level math skills. For two years, it was piloted successfully. Then, in 2010, PISD made a decision to open Math Rocks! to all Plano schools, not just those on the west side. Since then, Math Rocks! is at many PISD schools, such as Rice, Murphy, Schimelpfenig, Schell, Otto, Christie, and McCall. Andreescu helps to direct the program. Subjects of Math Rocks! include simple sums, nice numbers, factorials, math and chess, divisors of numbers, tangrams, magic squares, cryptarithmetic, and digits of numbers. Plano Independent School District has gotten special permission from the Mathematical Association of America (MAA) for students in Math Rocks! to participate in the American Mathematics Competitions (AMC.) These high level math tests include the AMC 8 (8th grade material), AMC 10 (10th grade material), the AMC 12 (12th grade material), and AIME. Students enrolled in Math Rocks! taking the AMC tests include third graders all the way to tenth graders.
