= Mathematical Olympiad Program =

American intensive math course

The Mathematical Olympiad Program (MOP), formerly called the Mathematical Olympiad Summer Program (MOSP), is an intensive summer program sponsored by the Mathematical Association of America. The main purpose of MOP, held since 1974, is to select and train the six members of the U.S. team for the International Mathematical Olympiad (IMO).

== Selection Process ==
Students qualify for the program by scoring highly on the United States of America Mathematical Olympiad (USAMO) or United States of America Junior Mathematical Olympiad (USAJMO).

Before 2012, the top twelve American scorers from all grades formed the "black" group. The approximately eighteen next highest American scorers among students from 11th grade and below form the "blue" group.

In 2004, the program was expanded to include approximately thirty of the highest-scoring American freshmen and sophomores each year, the "red" group; this was later split into two, forming the "green" group, which consists of approximately fifteen of the highest-scoring freshmen and sophomores who have qualified through the USAMO, and the "red" group, which consists of those who have qualified through the USAJMO. The colorful designations of these groups were adapted from Karate.

Until 2011, only black group MOPpers were eligible for the selection to the USA IMO team, determined by combining USAMO results with results of a similar competition called the Team Selection Test (TST). From 2011, a new competition called the Team Selection Test Selection Test (TSTST) was established. This exam is held at MOP and open for all non-graduating MOP participants, and the results of the TSTST determines the group of students who take part in the United States of America Team Selection Tests over the following school year. This cycle of six exam days, which includes the USAMO of that school year, determines the IMO team. More information about USA IMO team selection can be found here, and more details about MOP selection can be found here.

Canadians are allowed to take the USAMO but are not allowed to participate in MOP unless they are enrolled full-time in a US school. MOP also usually invites additional female students to the camp to prepare them for the process of selecting EGMO attendees.

The camp was led by academic director Po-Shen Loh from 2014 through 2024, and the current assistant academic director is Evan Chen. In 2023, Po-Shen Loh resigned from his position after finishing his initial ten year-long appointment.

Approximately 15 to 20 international students, 1-2 each from a subset of top-performing countries at the previous years' International Mathematical Olympiad (IMO), have been invited to MOP each year since 2016 (excluding 2020 through 2022 because of the COVID-19 pandemic) in an effort to provide a unique and diverse experience at MOP and build connections across borders.

== Cutoff scores ==
Red cutoffs from 2010 onward refer to USAJMO, while those for 2009 and earlier refer to USAMO.

Year	Black	Blue	Green	Red
2002	35			
2003	28			
2004	24			
2005	29			
2006	25	18		9
2007	23	17		9
2008	28	20		10
2009	27	18		8
2010	29	23	18	35
2011	35	28	21	28
2012		22	17	21
2013		22	14	29
2014		22	13	25
2015		16	11	27
2016		20	14	21
2017		20	16	36
2018		22	15	27
2019		28	21	33
2020		29	22	33
2021		29	23	34
2022		18	11	27
2023		30	23	34
2024		21	16	30
2025		27	21	35
2026		21	14	30

Note that certain cutoff scores may have involved tiebreakers, that is, not all eligible students who scored exactly the cutoff score were invited to the program.

The cutoff scores for each group are not entirely rigid, as some students are moved between groups at the beginning of the program. However, the cutoffs do dictate who is invited to the program. More information can be founded in the Selection Process section above.

Since MOP 2012, black group cutoffs for MOP in year N have been determined by total score on the six exam days for the United States of America Team Selection Tests held during the N-1 to N school year. As a result, the black group for MOP N consists of the team members of USA IMO N and several non-graduating students who were very close to qualifying for IMO N.

== Locations ==
The first few MOPs were held at Rutgers University. After that, and until 1995, the program was alternately hosted by the United States Naval Academy in Annapolis, Maryland in even-numbered years and by the United States Military Academy at West Point in odd-numbered years. The 1995 MOP was held at IMSA in Aurora, Illinois, where then-MOP director Titu Andreescu was a member of the math faculty. Most of the MOPs from 1996 through 2014 were held in Lincoln, Nebraska where the AMC headquarters was located. An exception was made in the summer of 2001, as the United States would be hosting the IMO that year in Washington, D.C., and nearby Georgetown was selected as the location for MOP. During 2015-2024, MOP was held at Carnegie Mellon University in Pittsburgh, Pennsylvania (except in 2020 and 2021, when it was held online due to COVID-19 pandemic concerns). In 2025, MOP was held at IMSA in Aurora, Illinois.

== Competitions at MOP ==
=== Team Selection Test Selection Test (TSTST) ===
Since 2011 (excluding 2020 and 2021), the TSTST has taken place during the latter days of MOP. Due to the COVID-19 pandemic, the three days of TSTST 2020 were administered remotely after MOP during the 2020-2021 school year on November 12th, December 10th, and January 21st, respectively.

For similar reasons, the US IMO Team Selection Test Cycle for IMO 2022 closely resembled the US IMO Team Selection Test Cycle for IMO 2021. The three days of TSTST 2021 were administered remotely during the 2021-2022 school year on November 4th, December 9th, and January 13th, respectively.

== Year-round MOP ==
For years, the idea of extending the training program for the U.S. IMO team was discussed. During the 2004–2005 school year, U.S. IMO team coach Zuming Feng directed the Winter Olympiad Training Program, utilizing the Art of Problem Solving (AoPS) site for discussion purposes. The program was short-lived, lasting only that year. MOP participants are now able to participate for free in Art of Problem Solving's WOOT program for year-round olympiad training.
