= Fasori Gymnasium =

High school in Budapest, Hungary

Coordinates: 47°30′31″N 19°4′34″E

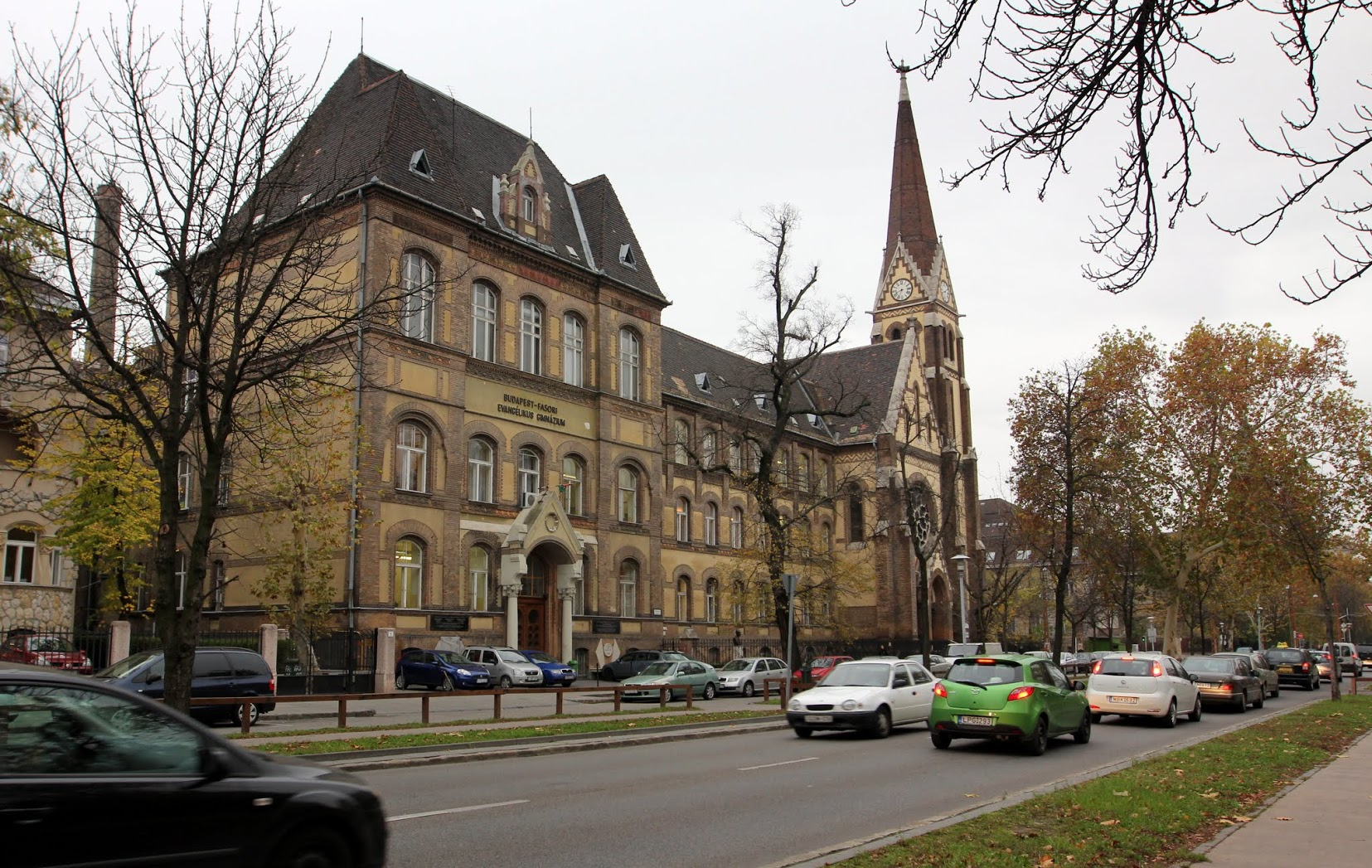

Information
- Established: 1823; 203 years ago
- Founder: The Lutheran Church
- Language: German (1823-1847); Hungarian (1847-present)
- Website: www.fasori.hu

The Fasori Gymnasium (Hungarian: Fasori Gimnázium, lit. 'secondary school on the tree-lined avenue', fasori=tree lined, gimnazium=secondary school), also known as the Fasori Lutheran Gymnasium (Fasori Evangélikus Gimnázium, official name: Budapest-Fasori Evangélikus Gimnázium), is a famous secondary school in Budapest, Hungary. It is located near the City Park. It is noted, together with Minta and the Piarist gymnasiums, for a number of talented students.

== History ==
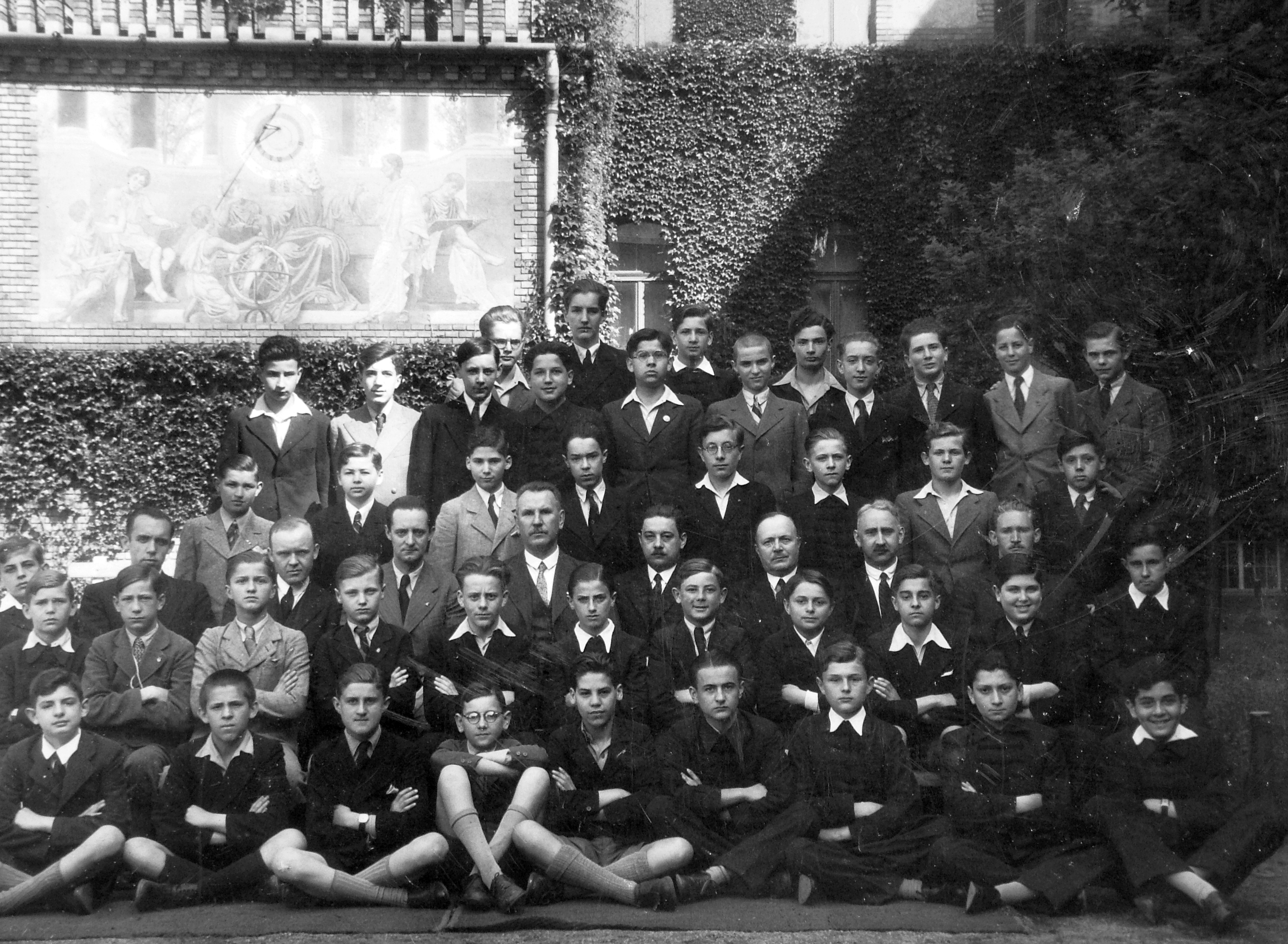
Fasori students and faculty, 1929

The school was founded by the Lutheran Church in 1823. It was originally situated at Deák Ferenc square, but moved to Sütő utca in 1864, and finally to its current location in Városligeti fasor ("Tree lined Avenue to the City Park") in 1904, receiving its present nickname. In the first decades of its existence it operated as a German-language institution, and in 1847 Hungarian became the language of instruction It had to close in 1952 under Communist pressure. The Fasori Gimnázium re-opened in 1989.

=== Notable faculty ===
- László Rátz, teacher of mathematics, gymnasium director from 1909 to 1914
- Mikola Sándor, teacher of physics between 1897 and 1935
- János Renner, teacher of mathematics and physics from 1911, director between 1945 and 1948
- Károly Böhm, philosopher, teacher between 1873 and 1896
- Zoltán Peskó, organist and musicologist, music teacher in the 1930s
- Dezső Kerecsényi, teacher of literature in the 1930s

=== Notable alumni ===
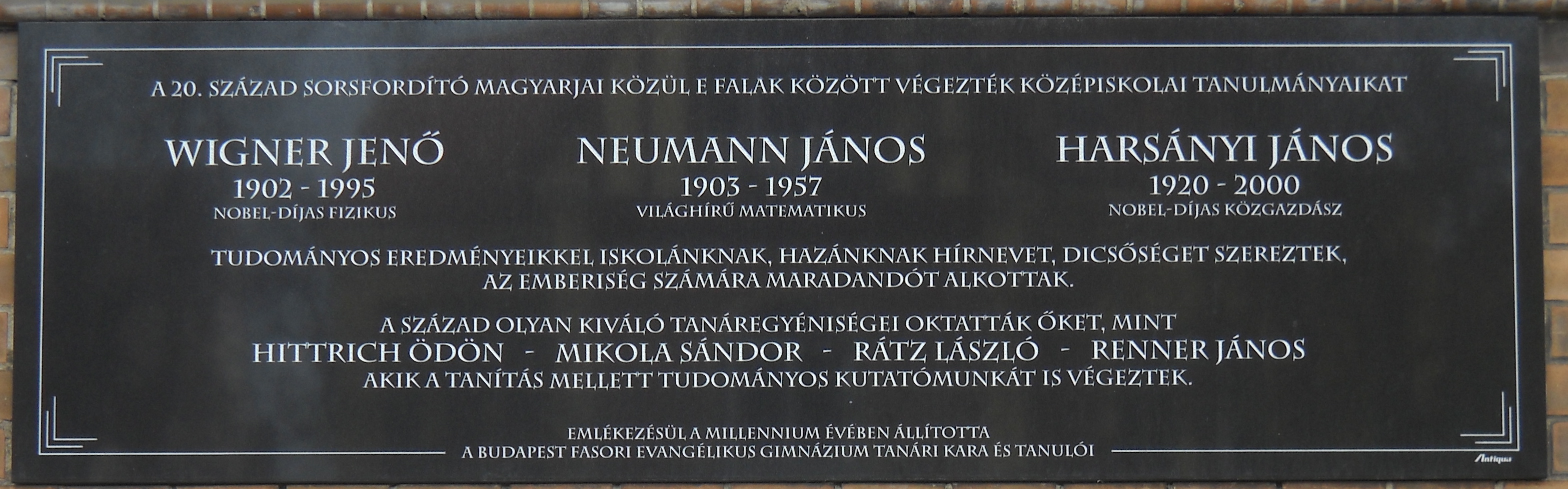
Commemorative plaque of Jenő Wigner, János Neumann and János Harsányi

- Julius Elischer, architect
- György Faludy, poet
- Miksa Fenyő, writer and politician
- Alfréd Haar, mathematician
- John Harsanyi, Nobel Prize winner economist
- György Pásztor, ice hockey player, Order of Merit of the Republic of Hungary
- Thomas Sebeok, linguist and semiotician
- John von Neumann, mathematician
- Eugene Wigner, Nobel Prize winner physicist and mathematician
- Kálmán Kandó, mechanical engineer
- Gábor Kornél Tolnai, inventor

== See also ==
- List of notable secondary schools in Hungary
