= Luis Davidson San Juan =

Cuban mathematician

Luis J. Davidson San Juan
- Born: September 10, 1921
- Died: November 10, 2011 (aged 90)
- Education: University of Havana
- Awards: Paul Erdős Award (1992)
- Scientific career
- Fields: Mathematics; Pedagogy
- Thesis: Developments on the series of analytic functions (1944)

Luis J. Davidson San Juan (September 10, 1921 – November 10, 2011) was a Cuban mathematician, professor and Doctor in Mathematics, known for his contributions to the fields of mathematics and pedagogy. He is renowned for receiving the Paul Erdős Award in 1992 by the International Commission on Mathematical Instruction, and for being awarded the distinction of Maestro Founder of Mathematics in Ibero-America by the Organization of Ibero-American States for Education, Science and Culture. He was the Vice President of the International Mathematical Olympiad Site Committee in 1988. And he is the author of many books, including Equations and mathematicians (2008), and Problems of elementary mathematics (1987).

== Life ==
Born in Havana, Cuba on September 10, 1921, he earned the Doctorate in Physics and Mathematical Sciences from the University of Havana in 1944 with the thesis entitled Developments on the series of analytic functions.

From 1945 to 1961 he taught at the Instituto de Segunda Enseñanza in Matanzas, and in 1950 he was part of the delegation that represented Cuba at the International Congress of Mathematicians at Harvard University.

In 1960, he held the position of National Inspector of Mathematics. And starting in 1963, he organized competitions in mathematics for pre-collegiate students throughout Cuba.

In 1971, he represented Cuba, as Head of the national delegation in the International Mathematical Olympiad, and in 1988, while a member of the organization, he became the Vice President for the IMO Site Committee.

In 1990 he participated in the First Congress of The World Federation of National Mathematics Competitions at Waterloo, and in 1992 he was awarded the Paul Erdős Award from the International Commission of Mathematical Instruction that was held in Québec, Canada.

Some of his books that were published in Spanish are Contests in mathematics (1974), Problems in elementary mathematics (1987), and Equations and mathematicians (1988). The latter was part of a series that he planned to write about: a story about mathematicians and the problems they have solved.

He died on November 10, 2011.

== Publications ==
- Davidson San Juan, Luis J.; Recio, Félix (1974). Contests in mathematics. Centro de desarrollo educativo. p. 144.
- Davidson San Juan, Luis J. (1987). Problems in elementary mathematics. Editorial Pueblo y Educación.
- Davidson San Juan, Luis J. (2008). Equations and mathematicians. Editorial Pueblo y Educación.

OCLC 491852201, 491852220, 4041321
