= American Invitational Mathematics Examination =

High school mathematics competition in the USA

The American Invitational Mathematics Examination (AIME) is a 15-question, 3-hour test given to students who score sufficiently well on the AMC 12 or the AMC 10 mathematics examinations. The AIME is the second of two annual tests used to determine qualification for the prestigious United States of America Mathematical Olympiad (USAMO or USAJMO), the first being the American Mathematics Competitions (AMC, formerly AHSME) or the additional pathway of the United States of America Mathematical Talent Search (USAMTS). The AIME has been held annually since 1983, and the rules and qualification thresholds have changed substantially since then. The competition is organized by the Mathematical Association of America (MAA).

== History ==
The AIME began in 1983, organized by a committee chaired by Hungarian-American mathematician George Berzsenyi (1938–2026), under the auspices of the MAA. The exam was initially given once per year, on a Tuesday or Thursday in late March or early April. During the 1990s, fewer than 2,000 students typically qualified for the AIME. However, in 1994, an unprecedented 99 students achieved perfect scores on the AHSME, causing delays in result distribution. The usual pamphlets were replaced by thick newspaper bundles. Between 2000 and 2026, two AIME exams were offered annually: AIME I and AIME II, an alternate for those who couldn't make the first, including all international students.

In 2020, the COVID-19 pandemic led to cancellation of the AIME II for that year. Instead, qualifying students were able to take the American Online Invitational Mathematics Examination, which contained the problems that were originally going to be on the AIME II. The 2021 AIME I and II were also moved online. The AIME resumed fully in-person in 2023. Since then, the AIME competition has historically invited those who rank around the top 13-15% on the AMC 12 to qualify for the AIME and invites those who rank around the top 6-8% on the AMC 10. Previously, the use of pencils, erasers, rulers, and compasses were permitted (but not calculators).

Another pathway to qualify for the AIME is through the USAMTS, a free proof-based math contest. Since 2025, USAMTS students who score at least 68 out of 75 qualify for the AIME.

=== Changes for the 2027 AIME ===
In August 2026, the MAA announced several significant changes for the 2027 AIME, citing the need to protect the integrity of the competition. The exam will be administered at specific Pearson testing centers and will only be available to students aged 13 and over. The AIME will be held within a 2-day window, with no alternate AIME II testing date. The 3-hour competition will be split into two 90-minute halves, with 8 questions in the first half and 7 questions in the second half. Students will be charged an $85 registration fee, with financial aid available when necessary.

=== Historical results ===
The table below lists the mean and median scores for recent AIME examinations.

Contest	Mean score	Median score
2026 I	6.26	6
2026 II	6.55	6
2025 I	6.16	6
2025 II	6.24	6
2024 I	5.89	5
2024 II	5.45	5
2023 I	4.28	4
2023 II	4.40	4
2022 I	4.82	4
2022 II	4.40	4
2021 I	5.44	5
2021 II	5.42	5
2020 I	5.70	6
2020 II (Note: Due to COVID-19, 2020 AIME II (AOIME) was moved online.)	6.13	6
2019 I	5.88	6
2019 II	6.47	6
2018 I	5.09	5
2018 II	5.48	5
2017 I	5.69	5
2017 II	5.64	5
2016 I	5.83	6
2016 II	4.43	4
2015 I	5.29	5
2015 II	6.63	6
2014 I	4.88	5
2014 II	5.49	5

== Rules and scoring ==
The 3-hour competition consists of 15 questions of roughly increasing difficulty, where each answer is an integer between 000 and 999 inclusive. Thus the competition effectively removes the element of chance afforded by a multiple-choice test while preserving the ease of automated grading. Calculators, rulers, protractors, and other aids are not allowed.

Concepts typically covered in the competition include topics in elementary algebra, geometry, trigonometry, as well as number theory, probability, and combinatorics. Many of these concepts are not directly covered in typical high school mathematics courses; thus, participants often turn to supplementary resources to prepare for the competition.

One point is earned for each correct answer, and no points are deducted for incorrect answers. No partial credit is given, so AIME scores are integers from 0 to 15 inclusive.

=== USA(J)MO qualification ===
Prior to the 2026–2027 academic year, USA(J)MO qualification was based on a combination of a student's AMC 10 or 12 score and their AIME score. Historically, a student's AMC score would be added to 10 times their AIME score (20 times in the 2025–2026 academic year) to determine their USA(J)MO qualification index. Since 2017, the USA(J)MO qualification cutoffs were split between the AMC 10/12 A and B examinations, as well as the AIME I and II. Therefore, there were up to 8 published USA(J)MO qualification cutoffs per year, and a student could have up to two indices depending on whether they took both an AMC 10A or AMC 12A, and an AMC 10B or AMC 12B. In the 2025–2026 academic year, no cutoffs were released and approximately 11% of AIME participants received Olympiad invitations.

For the 2026–2027 academic year, AMC 10 and AMC 12 scores will no longer affect qualification for the USA(J)MO after the student qualifies for the AIME.

== Sample problems ==
- Given that
$\frac{((3!)!)!}{3!} = k \cdot n!,$

where $k$ and $n$ are positive integers and $n$ is as large as possible, find $k + n.$ (2003 AIME I #1)
Answer: 839

- Find the number of ordered pairs of integers $(a, b)$ such that the sequence
$3, 4, 5, a, b, 30, 40, 50$

is strictly increasing and no set of four (not necessarily consecutive) terms forms an arithmetic progression. (2022 AIME I #6)
Answer: 228

- If the integer $k$ is added to each of the numbers $36$, $300$, and $596$, one obtains the squares of three consecutive terms of an arithmetic series. Find $k$. (1989 AIME #7)

Answer: 925

- Complex numbers $a$, $b$ and $c$ are the zeros of a polynomial $P(z) = z^3+qz+r$, and $|a|^2+|b|^2+|c|^2=250$. The points corresponding to $a$, $b$, and $c$ in the complex plane are the vertices of a right triangle with hypotenuse $h$. Find $h^2$. (2012 AIME I #14)

Answer: 375

The MAA published a book presenting the first six years of AIME problems and solutions (1983–1988) together with the AHSME qualifiers.

== See also ==
- List of mathematics competitions
