= Titu's lemma =

Mathematical inequality

In mathematics, Titu's lemma (also known as Bergström's inequality, Engel's form or Sedrakyan's inequality) is an algebraic inequality that establishes a lower bound for the sum of fractions whose numerators are squares of real numbers. It is a direct consequence of the Cauchy–Schwarz inequality. Nevertheless, the inequality written in this form can be used as a proof technique and has some useful new applications.

The inequality has been independently published several times. In 1997, Nairi Sedrakyan introduced applications of the inequality in the Russian journal Kvant.. In 1998, Arthur Engel included the statement as a fundamental technique in Problem-Solving Strategies. In 2003, Titu Andreescu popularized the lemma in Mathematical Olympiad Treasures. In the book Algebraic Inequalities (Sedrakyan) several generalizations of this inequality are provided.

== Statement of the inequality ==
For any real numbers $a_1, a_2, a_3, \ldots, a_n$ and positive reals $b_1, b_2, b_3,\ldots, b_n,$ we have $\frac{a^2_1}{b_1} + \frac{a^2_2}{b_2} + \cdots + \frac{a^2_n}{b_n} \geq \frac{\left(a_1 + a_2 + \cdots + a_n\right)^2}{b_1 + b_2 + \cdots + b_n}.$ (Nairi Sedrakyan (1997), Arthur Engel (1998), Titu Andreescu (2003))

=== Probabilistic statement ===
Similarly to the Cauchy–Schwarz inequality, one can generalize Sedrakyan's inequality to random variables. In this formulation let $X$ be a real random variable, and let $Y$ be a positive random variable. X and Y need not be independent, but we assume $E[|X|]$ and $E[Y]$ are both defined. Then
$$\operatorname{E}[X^2/Y] \ge \operatorname{E}[|X|]^2 / \operatorname{E}[Y] \ge \operatorname{E}[X]^2 / \operatorname{E}[Y].$$

== Direct applications ==
Example 1. Nesbitt's inequality.

For positive real numbers $a, b, c:$ $\frac{a}{b+c} + \frac{b}{a+c} + \frac{c}{a+b} \geq \frac{3}{2}.$

Example 2. International Mathematical Olympiad (IMO) 1995.

For positive real numbers $a,b,c$, where $abc=1$ we have that $\frac{1}{a^3(b+c)}+\frac{1}{b^3(a+c)}+\frac{1}{c^3(a+b)} \geq \frac{3}{2}.$

Example 3.

For positive real numbers $a,b$ we have that $8(a^4+b^4) \geq (a+b)^4.$

Example 4.

For positive real numbers $a,b,c$ we have that $\frac{1}{a+b}+\frac{1}{b+c}+\frac{1}{a+c} \geq \frac{9}{2(a+b+c)}.$

=== Proofs ===
Example 1.

Proof: Use $n = 3,$ $\left(a_1, a_2, a_3\right) := (a, b, c),$ and $\left(b_1, b_2, b_3\right) := (a(b + c), b(c + a), c(a + b))$ to conclude:
$$\frac{a^2}{a(b + c)} + \frac{b^2}{b(c + a)} + \frac{c^2}{c(a + b)} \geq \frac{(a + b + c)^2}{a(b + c) + b(c + a) + c(a + b)} = \frac{a^2 + b^2 + c^2 + 2(ab + bc + ca)}{2(ab + bc + ca)} = \frac{a^2 + b^2 + c^2}{2(ab + bc + ca)} + 1 \geq \frac{1}{2} (1) + 1 = \frac{3}{2}. \blacksquare$$

Example 2.

We have that $\frac{\Big(\frac{1}{a}\Big)^2}{a(b+c)} + \frac{\Big(\frac{1}{b}\Big)^2}{b(a+c)} + \frac{\Big(\frac{1}{c}\Big)^2}{c(a+b)} \geq \frac{\Big(\frac{1}{a}+\frac{1}{b}+\frac{1}{c}\Big)^2}{2(ab+bc+ac)} = \frac{ab+bc+ac}{2a^2b^2c^2} \geq \frac{3 \sqrt[3]{a^2 b^2 c^2}}{2a^2b^2c^2} = \frac{3}{2}.$

Example 3.

We have $\frac{a^2}{1} + \frac{b^2}{1} \geq \frac{(a + b)^2}{2}$ so that $a^4 + b^4 = \frac{\left(a^2\right)^2}{1} + \frac{\left(b^2\right)^2}{1} \geq \frac{\left(a^2 + b^2\right)^2}{2} \geq \frac{\left(\frac{(a+b)^2}{2}\right)^2}{2} = \frac{(a + b)^4}{8}.$

Example 4.

We have that $\frac{1}{a+b} + \frac{1}{b+c} + \frac{1}{a+c} \geq \frac{(1+1+1)^2}{2(a+b+c)} = \frac{9}{2(a+b+c)}.$
