= Patricia Fauring =

Argentine mathematician

Ana María Patricia Fauring is an Argentine mathematician who won the Paul Erdős Award for being "the principal mathematician involved in training Argentine teams for the IMO and other international events, where they have done respectably".

Fauring obtained her PhD in 1982 from the University of Buenos Aires under the supervision of Ángel Rafael Larotonda. Her thesis was titled Una noción de estabilidad para campos vectoriales complejos (A notion of stability for complex vector fields).
