= Miksa Fenyő =

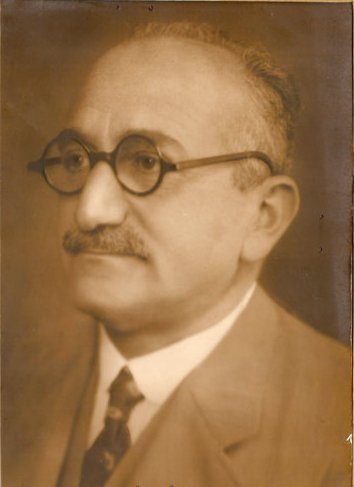
Miksa Fenyő

Miksa Fenyő (December 8, 1877 – April 4, 1972) was a Hungarian writer and intellectual, served as a member of parliament (elected 1931) in the early 1930s, and was appointed as a Minister of Trade and Commerce under the short-lived (24 hours) government cabinet of Prime Minister János Hadik in 1918.

He was also mentor and friend to Hungary's second most important poet laureate (Endre Ady), co-founded the most important periodical in Hungarian literature (Nyugat: "West"), and was an instrumental figure in the Hungarian Federation of Industrialists (GYOSZ) prior to World War II and its last managing director during the brief interlude between 1945 and 1947, whereafter he was forced to flee into exile out of concerns for his personal safety after being informed that Stalin wanted him and other petit-bourgeoise to be sent to Siberia.

== Biography ==
Fenyő was one of eight children born in Mélykút ("Deepwell"), Hungary into a hard-working Jewish tailoring family that produced quality attire and other fine clothing. Because of his exceptional abilities in composition and the Hungarian language in general he was awarded a scholarship to attend the then-prominent Lutheran Evangelical Gymnazium of Budapest. After graduating from high school with exceptional honors in Hungarian writing, he earned his Law Diploma from the Budapest University of Law (now part of the Eötvös Loránd University).

After a brief and failed attempt at working as a private attorney, he found an opportunity to work for the then two-year-old Hungarian Federation of Industrialists (GYOSZ), an organization which became key to the development of Hungary's primarily rural agricultural economic base, into an increasingly industrial one. In 1908 Fenyő, whose first and foremost love was writing, and two other writers, Hugo Ignotus and Ernő Osvát, founded the literary and social journal Nyugat (Eng. "West"). The "West" soon became the most controversial and high caliber periodical review for Hungarian intellectuals, including some who later became Nobel Prize-winning scientists and researchers, and its content and history are part of the government high school-level curricula today ever since the end of World War II.

Fenyő was active in the Hungarian government during the period between World War I and II. As an independent member of the Hungarian Parliament, Miksa wrote a critical and cautionary study on Hitler and the dictator's dangerous plans for Europe. He was virtually the only Member of Parliament to dare criticize the Nazi regime. This essay lead to Miksa being placed on Adolf Hitler's personal "Most Wanted List."

Fenyő was forced into hiding during WWII. During this time he kept a diary, which was published in 1946 and was a best-seller that same year.

In the post-war years Miksa was invited to become a minister in the new Jewish State of Israel by David Ben-Gurion, but he refused because of concerns about violence following the creation of the new state and his personal religious affiliation, since he had converted to Catholicism more than 30 years earlier. His conversion out of Judaism into Catholicism was more out of a social and socioeconomic consideration (something clearly depicted to in the movie Sunshine, starring Ralph Fiennes and Rachel Weisz, directed by István Szabó, who also wrote the screenplay, released by Paramount Pictures in 1999). In general Miksa Fenyő was an agnostic who cherished some of his original Jewish cultural traditions and many non-Jewish Hungarian and Italian cultural traditions.

Fenyő became a US citizen in the early 1950s and lived in New York City until moving to Vienna with his second wife Ria in 1969. During much of his adult life he traveled regularly to his favorite country, Italy. In 1964 he was awarded the prestigious Italian Rome Award for his travel journal and diary Ami Kimaradt Az Odysseaböl (English trans.: That Which The Odyssey Forgot To Mention).

On April 4, 1972, Fenyő died in Vienna at the age of 95, at his last residence on Seilerstätte Strasse. He had one son, Mario D. Fenyo, who immigrated to the US with his father in 1950 and is a professor of history in Annapolis, Maryland.

Miksa Fenyő is a major figure in Hungarian literature, as he was one of the three founding editors of the "NYUGAT" (Eng. "WEST") Literary Review; which is a major topic of required study for Hungarian high-school students and for university students studying Hungarian literature.

== Selected publications ==
- Casanova, a study on Giacomo Giuseppe Casanova de Seingalt, in Hungarian, published via his own publishing firm, the Nyugat Kiadó, Budapest 1912.
- Hitler; Egy Tanulmány, a study warning Hungary on the nature of and policies of Adolf Hitler and his Nazi Party, in Hungarian, published via his own publishing firm, the Nyugat Kiadó, Budapest 1934. Note: it is for writing this particular book that Miksa Fenyő, who as an independent M.P. in the Hungarian Parliament gave out free copies to other prominent and influential M.P.s, was placed on Hitler's personal most wanted "dead or alive" list.
- Az Elsodort Ország (English trans.: A Country Adrift), a diary written by Miksa Fenyő, while in hiding from the Nazis and Arrow Cross, published by Révai Kiadó, Budapest 1946.
- Följegyzések a "Nyugat" folyóiratról és környékéről (English trans.: Notes on The West periodical review and its circumstances), published by Pátria Könyvkiadó, Canada 1960.
- Ami Kimaradt Az Odysseából (English trans.: That Which The Odyssey Forgot To Mention), travel journal and diary reflections on Italy, published by Griff Kiadó, Munich 1963.
- Önéletrajzom (English trans.: My Autobiography), published posthumously by Argumentum Kiadó, Budapest 1994.
- Jézus is D.P. Volt (English trans.; Jesus was also a Displaced Person), the author's only full fictional novel about a Hungarian intellectual escaping from the Rakosi Stalinist Hungarian dictatorship sometime prior to 1956, published posthumously under the auspices of The Fenyő Family Trust, with the consent of Jean-Pierre Ady Fenyő, by Argumentum Kiadó, Budapest 2006.
