= Dániel Berzsenyi =

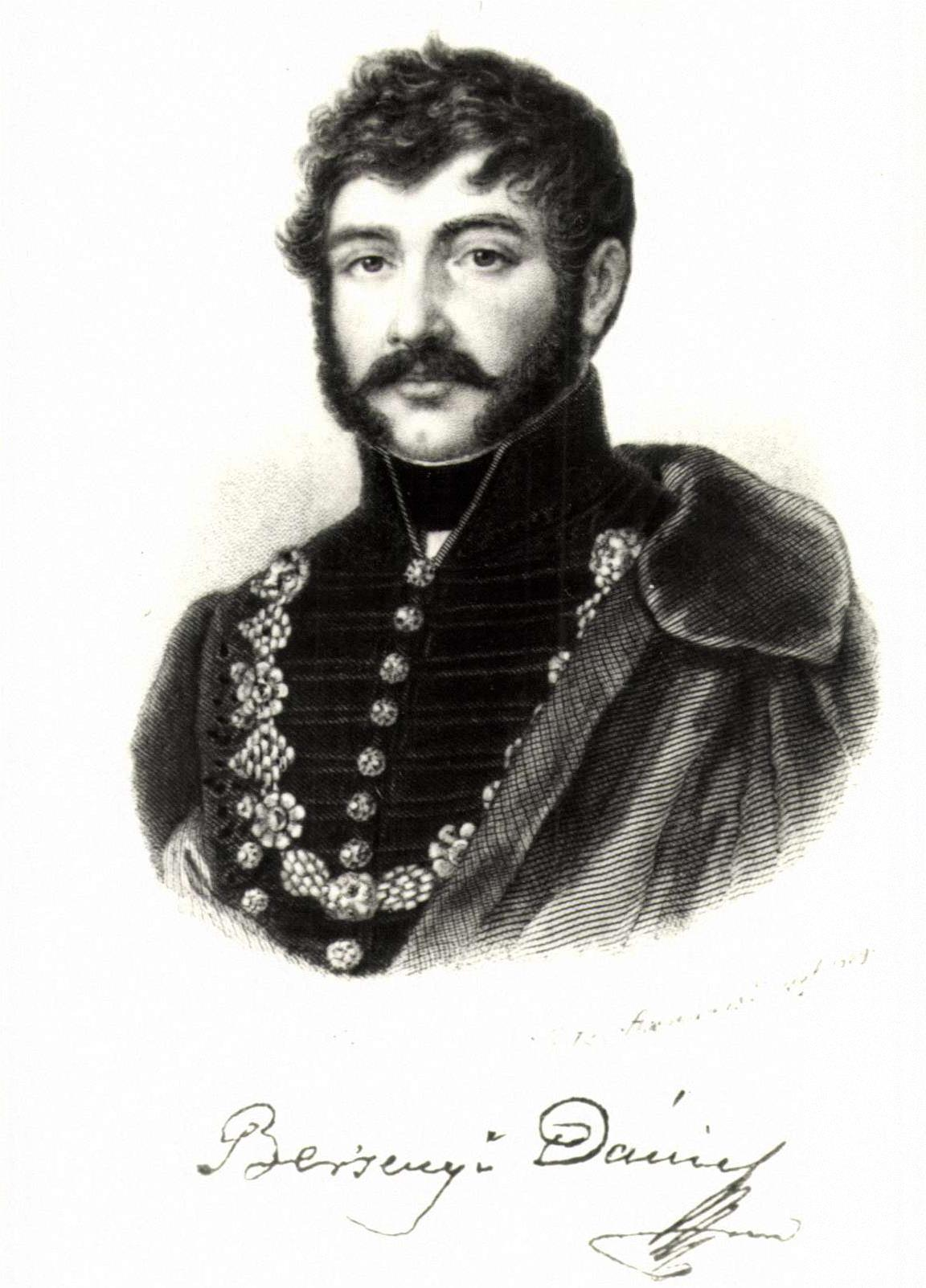
Dániel Berzsenyi

Dániel Berzsenyi (Hungarian pronunciation: [ˈdaːniɛl ˈbɛrʒɛɲi]; 7 May 1776 in Hetye (now Egyházashetye) – 24 February 1836 in Nikla) was a Hungarian poet.

Berzsenyi was one of the most contradictory poets of Hungarian literature. He lived the life of a farmer, and wished to be close to the events of Hungarian literature. This contradiction, which he believed he could solve, made him a lonesome, introverted and bitter poet. His works show signs of classicism, sentimentalism and romanticism.

== Biography ==
Berzsenyi was born the only child of an old noble family. Although his father had a degree in law, he worked on his farm and didn't practise as a lawyer. The father believed that his weak and sickly son must first get physically strong working on the farm. In his opinion, teaching children is only acceptable after the age of ten.

In the autumn of 1788, the 12-year-old Berzsenyi began his studies at the evangelical lyceum in Sopron. He spent seven years there, with shorter and longer interruption. Due to his over-age, he had a hard time conforming himself to the discipline of the school and came up often against the customs; he often missed his lessons. In 1793, he left Sopron without finishing his studies and enlisted into the army, but he stayed there only for less than a year.

Although he never finished his studies, the years spent in Sopron left a deep impression in him. He read many books, acquired outstanding knowledge of the main subjects of that age, of the Latin and German language. His works point to the fact, that he knew the Roman mythology well, and that his ideal was the Roman Horace.

His father found Berzsenyi's behavior in Sopron unacceptable, and the relationship of son and father got worse and worse. Due to his frequent conflicts with his father, he didn't return home from Sopron, but travelled to Nikla, to his uncle. He returned to his father for a few years, but the situation became even worse with the death of his mother in the autumn of 1794, who was a lightning rod of some kind between the two men.

=== Poetic era ===
As an "escape" from his father, he married the 14-year-old Zsuzsanna Dukai Takács, the daughter of a wealthy noble and settled with her on her farm near Sömjén. Berzsenyi became a self-supporting and outstanding farmer. In 1804, they moved to Nikla, Somogy county. On the outside, he seemed to be satisfied, but his works prove this wrong. On one hand, he was truly satisfied with his achievements as a farmer. On the other hand, he suffered from the lack of people he could converse with about literature or sciences.

Berzsenyi wrote poems from age twenty (1796), but hid them from his friends and family. In 1803, János Kis, an evangelic cleric and the godfather of one of his children, caught him while he was writing. Kis discovered the poet in Berzsenyi, and sent three of his works to Ferenc Kazinczy, who was rather enthusiastic about them. (A magyarokhoz - To the Hungarians; Nagy Lajos és Hunyadi Mátyás - Louis the Great and Mathias of Hunyad; A reggel - The dawn)

In 1808, he sent János Kis a whole book of verse with 77 poems. Unfortunately, he didn't date the poems, making it impossible to tell the exact time he wrote them. Kis sent them on to Ferenc Kazinczy to support their printed publishment. Kazinczy read them and sent Berzsenyi his first, enthusiastic mail. Naturally Berzsenyi sent his reply, and their long mailing began.

He left Nikla very rarely, he didn't like going away from home. He only visited Pest only twice: in March 1810, and at the end of May 1813. The first time he met Kazinczy's poet friends, waking dispositions for each other. (Pál Szemere, Ferenc Kölcsey, Michaly Vitkovics and István Horvát) In 1812, he spent a week in Vienna. Here, he had a picture painted of himself in preparation for the front cover of his book.

=== Scientific era ===
After 1810, he had a rather unproductive era, possibly due to the matters of farming and quarrels with his family. His loneliness, his mood, prone to melancholy, and versatile health made him very vulnerable. From 1816 on, he had problems with his health almost every year. He read Kölcsey's strict, sometimes unfair recension in this unlucky state of body and mind. The recension was published in the issue of Tudományos Gyűjtemény (Scientific Collection) in July, 1817. Berzsenyi felt the criticism degrading, undeserved and unfounded. He believed that it was a personal attack and that it was Ferenc Kazinczy behind the recension. Their mailing was suspended for three years.

After Kölcsey's recension Berzsenyi wrote only a few more poems. His greatest wish was to give Kölcsey an appropriate answer. In his first indignation he wrote his anti-recension without any scientific preparation, as - until this time - he didn't study aesthetics. Although he sent it to the editors of Tudományos Gyűjtemény (Scientific Collection), but it was never published. He never got the manuscript back, despite his pressing requests.

In the next years, the place of poetic creation was taken by scientific works and the study of aesthetics and literature: he tried to make up for the gaps in his knowledge. The "appropriate" answer was published in 1825 with the title "Észrevételek Kölcsey recenziójára" (Observations about Kölcsey's recension) in the September issue of the Tudományos Gyűjtemény (Scientific Collection) - he spent eight years making it. He refused Kölcsey's pretensions based on the aesthetics of classicism in the name of romanticism: he is a poet who cannot be judged by the rules of hellenism. (By 1825 Kölcsey changed his previous poetic-aesthetic views)

Berzsenyi spent most of his time on sciences, the numerous essays show this. He published "A versformákról" (About versifications). Between 1829 and 1834, he wrote "Kriticai levelek" (Critical letters) as well. In 1830 he became the first provincial member of the Hungarian Academy of Sciences. His inaugural was published in 1833 with the title "Poetai harmonistica" (Poetical harmony). In this essay he favored the aesthetic thesis of classicism over those of romanticism: the main regularity in the world is the harmony. In 1833, he also wrote "A magyarországi mezei szorgalom némely akadályairul" (in modern English: About some obstacles of farming in Hungary).

In the last years of his life, he ailed almost all the time: he cured himself in Balatonfüred and the medicinal baths of Buda. He often attended the conferences of the Tudós társaság (roughly: Scientific group) and planned to move to the capital), but couldn't finish this plan.

=== Death and legacy ===
Berzsenyi died on 24 February 1836 in Nikla, where his home still stands. Kölcsey's expiatory memorial heroic was read by Michael Helmeczy on the Academy. In 1920, a Budapest secondary school was renamed Berzsenyi Dániel Gimnázium in his honor. One of his great-great-grandchildren was the Hungarian-American mathematician George Berzsenyi (1938–2026).

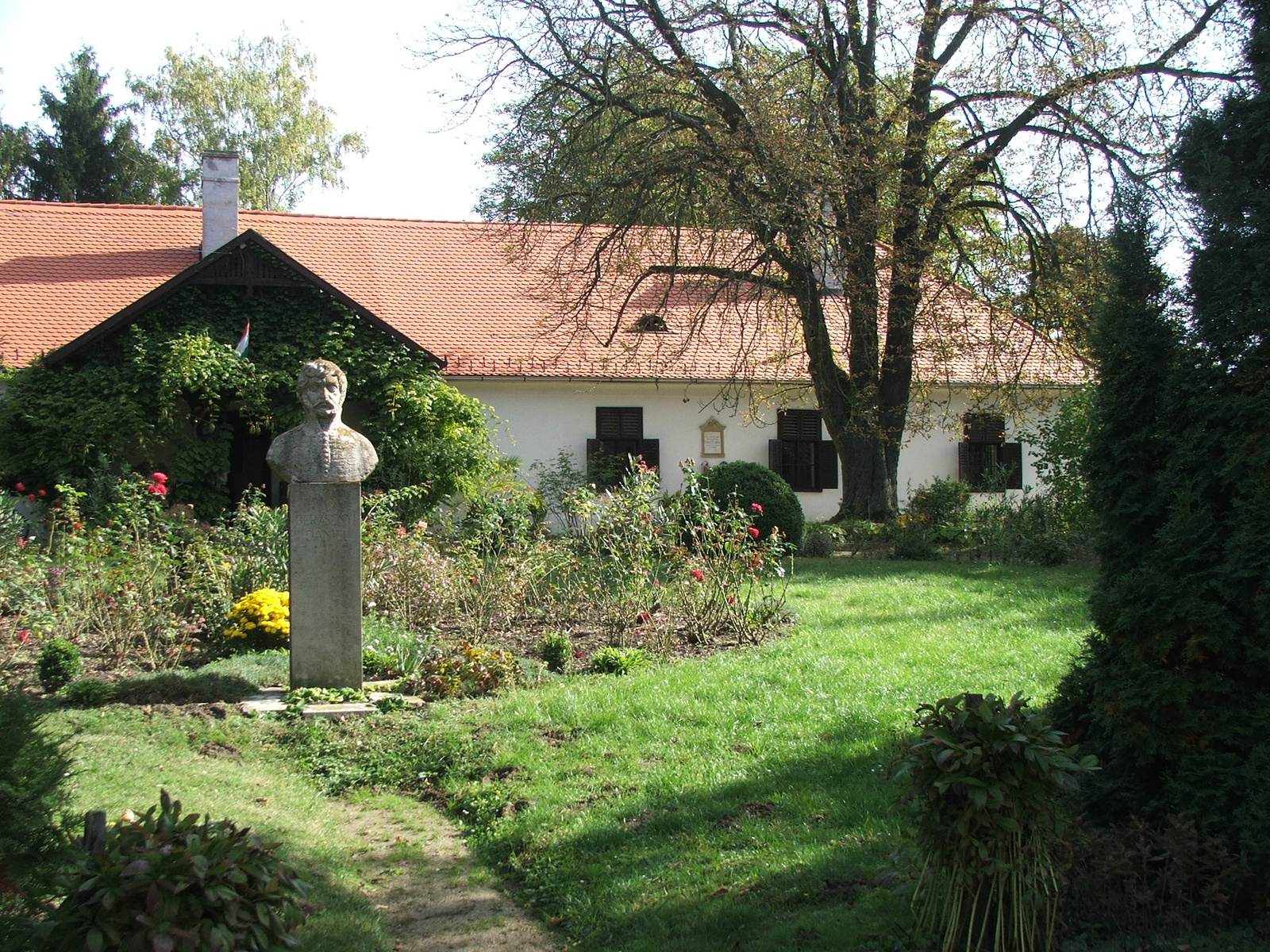
Berzsenyi Mansion, in Nikla

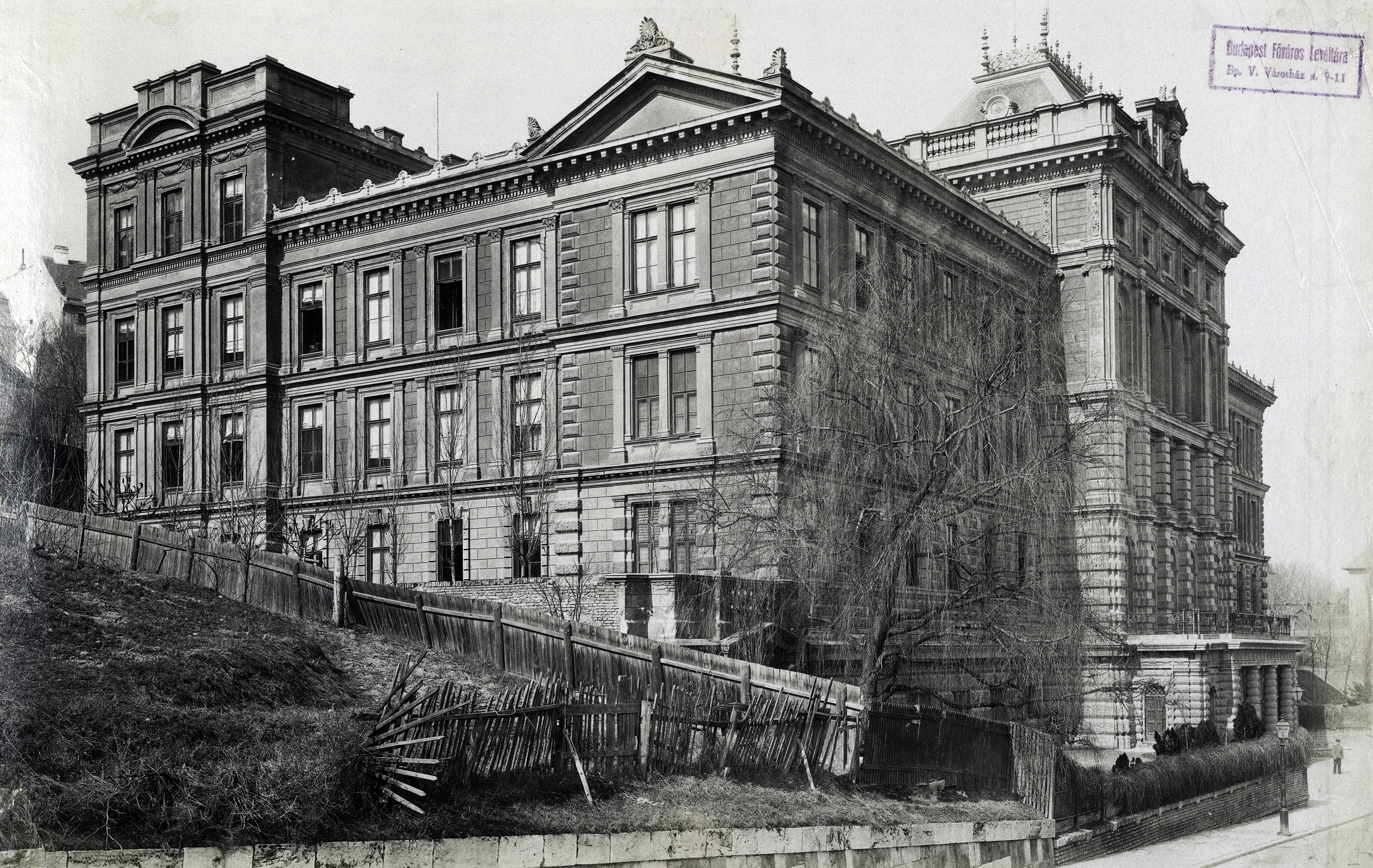
Berzsenyi Dániel Gimnázium, in Budapest

== Work ==
Horatius' poetry and his philosophy - abstention from extreme emotions, the golden middle course - seemed to determine his life and poetry. Most of the criticals of his age described him as Horatius-copyist. He often used ancient verse forms and applied them successfully to the Hungarian language.

Berzsenyi got classicist inspiration from Horace and the Hungarian Benedek Virág, but he couldn't possibly be successful in forcing the views of ancient poets on himself. Behind the antique verse forms it isn't the classical balance and harmony we can find: it is the longing for these qualities. His closing to romanticism from classicism can be addressed to the works of German poets and writers like Gessner and Matthisson.

Two styles were present in his poetry at the same time - just as the land-owner and the poet in his life, but slowly his ideals were worn out by reality. Disappointment, disillusioned distress take the place of his dreams. In his poem "Barátaimhoz" (To my friends) he says his earlier feelings, dreams to be pointless and remembers his poetic work in past time.
