= Nairi Sedrakyan =

Armenian mathematician

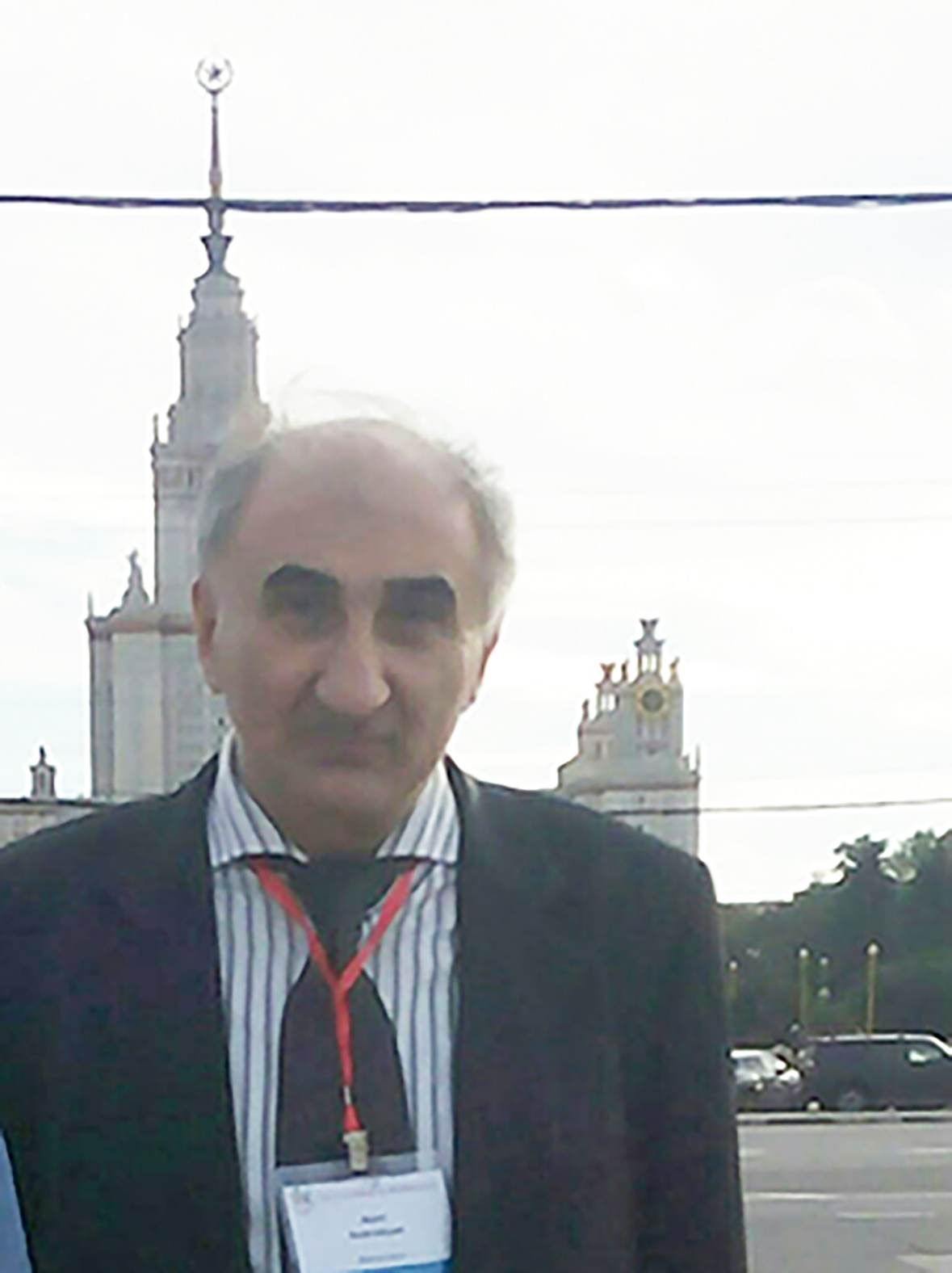
- Sedrakyan in Moscow
- Born: Nairi Sedrakyan; 25 July 1961 (age 64); USSR, Ninotsminda, Georgian SSR
- Known for: Sedrakyan's inequality
- Spouse: Margarita Karapetyan
- Children: Ani Sedrakyan, Hayk Sedrakyan
- Awards: Erdős Award 2022
- Scientific career
- Fields: Mathematics

Nairi Sedrakyan (born 1961 in Ninotsminda, USSR) is Erdős Award 2022 winner Armenian mathematician involved in national and international Olympiads, including American Mathematics Competitions (USA) and IMO, having been the president of the Armenian Mathematics Olympiads, the Leader of Armenian IMO Team, a jury member and problem selection committee member of the International Mathematical Olympiad, a jury member and problem selection committee member of the Zhautykov International Mathematical Olympiad (IZhO), a jury member and problem selection committee member of the International Olympiad of Metropolises, the president and organizer of the International Mathematical Olympiad Tournament of the Towns in the Republic of Armenia (1986-2013). He has also authored a large number of problems proposed in these Olympiads. The government of Armenia awarded the author the title of the best teacher of Armenia and he received a special gift from the Prime Minister. Nairi Sedrakyan's son Hayk Sedrakyan is also a professional mathematician and former IMO competitor.

Nairi Sedrakyan is known for Sedrakyan's inequality.

Nairi Sedrakyan has authored 14 books and around 70 articles in different countries (USA, Switzerland, South Korea, Russia) on the topic of problem solving and Olympiad style mathematics.

== Early life and education ==
Nairi Sedrakyan was born in the USSR in the town of Ninotsminda in the Georgian SSR. At the age of 14 years old he left Ninotsminda for Yerevan, Armenian SSR to advance his mathematical knowledge and to study mathematics at the PhysMath School after A. Shahinyan (Yerevan), one of the leading schools in Armenia. He continued his Bachelor, Master and PhD studies at the Yerevan State University in the faculty of Mathematics and Mechanics, widely regarded by students as one of the toughest faculties in the university.

== Mathematics coaching and Olympiads ==
The students of Nairi Sedrakyan have obtained 20 medals (1 gold medal, 4 silver medals, 15 bronze medals, one of which was received by his son Hayk Sedrakyan) in the International Mathematical Olympiad, providing more than half of the medals that Armenia received in the history of its participation in the International Mathematical Olympiad. So far it is the single Gold Medal of Armenia in the International Mathematical Olympiad.

== Honours ==
Awards

- Erdos Award 2022 http://www.wfnmc.org/awards.html
- Gold medal for contributions in the World's Olympic and scientific activities in mathematics. University of Riga and Latvian mathematical society.
- The highest award of the Ministry of Education and Sciences of Armenia. Gold medal for Olympic activities in mathematics.
- The best teacher of Armenia, 2000. Award of the Ministry of Education and Sciences of Armenia.
- The best teacher of Armenia, 1993. Award of the Ministry of Education and Sciences of Armenia.
- Special gift from the Prime Minister and the government of Armenia, 2000.

== Books (published in USA, Switzerland, South Korea and Russia) ==
- AMC 12 preparation book, USA (2021, in English)
- AMC 10 preparation book, USA (2021, in English)
- AMC 8 preparation book, USA (2021, in English)
- AIME preparation book, USA (2022, in English)
- Number theory through exercises, USA (2018, in English)
- How to prepare for math Olympiads, USA (2019, in English)
- Algebraic Inequalities, Springer International Publishing, USA (2018, in English)
- The Stair-Step Approach in Mathematics, Springer International Publishing, USA (2018, in English)
- Geometric inequalities: methods of proving, Springer International Publishing, Switzerland (2017, in English)
- Inequalities: methods of proving 1, Kyowoo publ., South Korea (2015, in Korean)
- Inequalities: methods of proving 2, Kyowoo publ., South Korea (2015, in Korean)
- Inequalities: methods of proving, Fizmatlit publ., Russia (2002, in Russian)
