= Középiskolai Matematikai és Fizikai Lapok =

- Discipline: Mathematics
- Language: Hungarian, English

Standard abbreviations
- ISO 4: Középisk. Mat. és Fiz. Lapok

Indexing
- ISSN: 1215-9247

Középiskolai Matematikai és Fizikai Lapok [Mathematical and Physical Journal for Secondary Schools] (KöMaL) is a Hungarian mathematics and physics journal for high school students. It was founded by Dániel Arany, a high school teacher from Győr, Hungary and has been continually published since 1894.

KöMaL has been organizing various renowned correspondence competitions for high school students, making a major contribution to Hungarian high school education. Winners of the competition include many leading Hungarian scientists and mathematicians. Since the early 1970s, all of the problems in the KöMaL journal have been translated into English; published solutions, however, are not typically translated.

In addition to problems in mathematics, physics and more recently, informatics, the journal contains articles on those subjects. A 100-year archive of issues is provided online.

The journal's problem section and correspondence competition has been a source of inspiration for the United States of America Mathematical Talent Search.
