= United States of America Mathematical Olympiad =

High school math competition

The United States of America Mathematical Olympiad (USAMO) is a highly selective high school mathematics competition held annually in the United States. Since its debut in 1972, it has served as the final round of the American Mathematics Competitions. In 2010, it split into the USAMO and the United States of America Junior Mathematical Olympiad (USAJMO).

Top scorers on both six-question, nine-hour mathematical proof competitions are invited to join the Mathematical Olympiad Program to compete and train to represent the United States at the International Mathematical Olympiad.

== Eligibility ==
In order to be eligible to take the USAMO, a participant must be either a U.S. citizen or a legal resident of the United States or Canada. Only US citizens and permanent residents could be invited to the USAMO until 2003, other students legally residing in the US can be invited since 2004. Starting from IMO 2022, only U.S. permanent residents and citizens may join the American IMO team. In addition, all participants, regardless of geographic location, must meet qualification indices determined by previous rounds of the AMC contests. Entry to the USAMO is by invitation only.

== History ==
The USAMO was created in 1972 at the initiative of Nura D. Turner and Samuel L. Greitzer, and served as the next round to the AHSME until 1982. In 1983, the American Invitational Mathematics Examination was introduced as a bridge between the AHSME and USAMO. In 2010, the USAMO split into the USAMO and USAJMO.

== Historical participant selection process ==
The USAMO (and the USAJMO since 2010) is restricted to approximately 500 (250 prior to 2006) participants combined each year. To keep this quota constant, the AMC Committee uses a selection process, which has seen a number of revisions in the competition's history.

=== Present ===
Beginning with the 2025–2026 competition cycle, the weighting of the AIME in the calculation of AMC indices was revised. The AIME score, which had previously been multiplied by 10, is now multiplied by 20. With the update, the AMC 12 index is calculated as AMC 12 score + 20 × (AIME score). Similarly, the AMC 10 index is determined by the AMC 10 score + 20 × (AIME score). Qualification cutoffs have been determined using indices prior to the 2026 season. AMC 12–based indices are used to select students for the USAMO, while AMC 10–based indices are used to select students for the USAJMO. Both typically take around 200-300 students for the competition with the USAMO usually having 20-30 more students. If a student took the AMC 10 and 12 (i.e. AMC 10A and 12B or AMC 12A and 10B) and qualified for both the USAMO and USAJMO, the student must take the USAMO. This ended up being around the top 11% of all AIME participants for the 2025-2026 season. As of the 2025-2026 season, the USAMTS competition accepts 15 people for the USAMO and 10 people for the USAJMO, the top combined scorers of the USAMTS and AIME that didn't qualify through the traditional AMC cycle. The MAA introduced official competition sites for the 2026 USA(J)MO to create a more controlled setting and reduce the risk of academic dishonesty. The majority of these locations are university institutions.

In 2020, due to grading constraints caused by the COVID-19 pandemic, lower numbers of students were admitted (223 USAMO qualifiers and 158 USAJMO qualifiers). In addition, up until the 2024-2025 season, students who qualified for the AIME through scoring at least 68/75 on the USAMTS could have qualified for the USAMO by scoring at least 11 on the AIME or the USAJMO by scoring 9-10 on the AIME, provided the student is eligible.

=== 2011 ===
Since 2011, the goal has been to select approximately 500 students total for the two Olympiads where 270 students qualify for the USA Mathematical Olympiad (USAMO) and 230 students qualify for the 2011 USA Junior Mathematical Olympiad (USAJMO). Selection for the USAMO and USAJMO are made according to the following rules:

1. U.S. citizens and students residing in the United States and Canada (with qualifying scores) are eligible to take the USAMO and USAJMO.

2. Selection to the USAMO will be based on the USAMO index which is defined as AMC 12 Score + 10 * AIME Score. Selection to the USAJMO will be based on the USAJMO index which is defined as AMC 10 Score + 10 * AIME Score.

3. Only AMC 12 A or AMC 12 B takers who are U.S. citizens and students residing in the United States and Canada will be eligible for the USAMO.

4. Only AMC 10 A or AMC 10 B takers who are U.S. citizens and students residing in the United States and Canada will be eligible for the USAJMO. This automatically limits Junior Math Olympiad participation to 10th graders and below. Students who take ONLY the AMC 10 test, whether AMC 10 A or AMC 10 B or both, will NOT be eligible for the USAMO regardless of their score on the AMC 10 or the AIME.

5. The approximately 260-270 individual students with the top AMC 12 based USAMO indices will be invited to take the USAMO. These indices will be selected from the pool of AMC 12 takers with an AIME score.

6. The approximately 230-240 individual students with the top AMC 10 based USAMO indices will be invited to take the USAJMO. These indices will be selected from the pool of AMC 10 takers with an AIME score after removing students who also took an AMC 12 test and qualified for the USAMO in rule 5. This means young students MUST take the USAMO if they qualify through an AMC 12 index.

7. We will select the student with the numerically largest index, whether AMC 10 based USAJMO index or AMC 12 based USAMO index, from each US state not already represented in either the USAMO or the USAJMO. The student will be invited to the USAMO if the numerically highest index in the state is AMC 12 based, and invited to the USAJMO if the index is AMC 10 based.

=== 2010 ===
Starting in 2010, the USA Mathematical Olympiad is split into two parts. The USA Mathematical Olympiad will be administered to approximately 270 students, mostly selected from top ranking AMC12 participants. The AMC10 only participants will take part in USA Junior Mathematical Olympiad.

1.Selection to the USAMO and JMO will be based on the USAMO index which is defined as AMC score + 10 * AIME score.

2.Only AMC 12A or AMC 12B takers are eligible for the USAMO (with the slight exception mentioned in item 5 below).

3.Only AMC 10A and AMC 10B takers are eligible for the JMO. (This automatically limits Junior Math Olympiad participation to 10th graders and below.)

4.Approximately the top 260 AMC12 based USAMO indices will be invited to the USAMO.

5.In order to find unrecognized young talent, AMC 10 takers who score 11 or more on the AIME will be invited to the USAMO. (In 2008 and 2009 this was 5 or 6 students).

6.Select the top index from any state not already represented in the USAMO.

7.Approximately the top 220-230 students with AMC10 based USAMO indices and not already selected to the USAMO via an AMC12 based index will be invited to the JMO.

=== 2008 ===
Selection for the USAMO will be made according to the following rules:

1. The goal is to select about 500 of the top scorers from this year's AIME and AMC 12A, AMC 12B, AMC 10A and AMC 10B contests to participate in the USAMO.

2. Selection will be based on the USAMO index which is defined as 10 times the student's AIME score plus the student's score on the AMC 12 or the AMC 10.

3. The first selection will be the approximately 330 highest USAMO indices of students taking the AMC 12A or AMC 12B contest.

4. The lowest AIME score among those 330 first selected will determine a floor value. The second selection of approximately 160 USAMO participants will be among students in the 10th grade and below who received an AIME score at least as high as the floor value. If there are more than 160 young students with a score above the floor value, then approximately 160 students will be selected from this group by using the USAMO index.

5 The student with the highest USAMO index from each state, territory, or U.S. possession not already represented in the selection of the first and second groups will be invited to take the USAMO.

6. To adjust for variations in contest difficulty, the number of students selected from A & B contests will be proportional to the number of students who took the A & B Contests.

7. In advising young students (in grade 10 or below) who desire to be selected for the USAMO whether to take the AMC 12 contest or the AMC 10 contest, please be aware of the following facts:

a. In 2007, among 506 students invited to take the USAMO, 229 were in 10th grade and below. Those students had scored 6 or greater on the AIME.

b. Among those 229 students, 87 had their AIME qualifying high score based on the AMC 12 and 142 had their AIME qualifying high score based on the AMC 10.

c. In 2007, among 8,312 students who took the AIME, 2,696 were in grades 10 and below. Of those, 998 qualified for the AIME from the AMC 12 and 1,698 qualified from the AMC 10.

=== 2006-2007 ===
Beginning in 2006, the USAMO was expanded to include approximately 500 students (around 430 were actually invited, read below) due to a proposal and sponsorship from the Art of Problem Solving website:

1. The goal is to select about 500 of the top scorers from this year's AIME and AMC 12A, AMC 12B, AMC 10A and AMC 10B contests to participate in the USAMO.
2. Selection will be based on the USAMO index which is defined as 10 times the student's AIME score plus the student's score on the AMC 12 or the AMC 10.
3. The first selection will be the approximately 240 highest USAMO indices of students taking the AMC 12A or AMC 12B contest.
4. The lowest AIME score among those 240 first selected will determine a floor value. The second selection of approximately 120 USAMO participants will be among students in the 10th grade and below who received an AIME score at least as high as the floor value. If there are more than 120 young students with a score above the floor value, then approximately 120 students will be selected from this group by using the USAMO index.
5. The student with the highest USAMO index from each state, territory, or U.S. possession not already represented in the selection of the first and second groups will be invited to take the USAMO.
6. To adjust for variations in contest difficulty, the number of students selected from A & B contests will be proportional to the number of students who took the A & B Contests.
7. The selection process is designed to favor students who take the more mathematically comprehensive AMC 12A and AMC 12B contests.*
- Statement 7 above (quoted from the AMC website) has recently come under controversy. During the selection for the 2006 USAMO, students who qualified by the floor value (in grades seven through ten) were qualified based on AMC scores as well (see * below) as their AIME scores, yet no distinction was made between the AMC 12 contest and the generally easier AMC 10 contest, giving those who took the AMC 10 an advantage over those who took the AMC 12. Students in grades seven through ten who were in the first selection of qualifiers (see 3. above) would still have qualified even if they had taken the AMC 10, except in the rare case that they set the floor themselves, making the AMC 12 still non-advantageous.

=== 2002-2005 ===
Since 2002, the following set of guidelines have been adopted for use in determining each year's USAMO participants:

1. The goal is to select about 250 of the top scorers from the prior AIME and AMC 12A, AMC 12B, AMC 10A and AMC 10B contests to participate in the USAMO.
2. Selection will be based on the USAMO index which is defined as 10 times the student's AIME score plus the student's score on the AMC 12 or the AMC 10.
3. The first selection (consisting of participants from all grade levels) will be the approximately 160 highest USAMO indices of students taking the AMC 12A or AMC 12B contest.
4. The lowest AIME score among those 160 first selected will determine a floor value. The second selection of USAMO participants will be from the highest USAMO indices among students in grades seven through ten who got an AIME score at least as high as the floor value.
5. The student with the highest USAMO index from each state, territory, or U.S. possession not already represented in the selection of the first and second groups will be invited to take the USAMO.
6. To adjust for variations in contest difficulty, the number of students selected from A & B contests will be proportional to the number of students who took the (A & B) Contests.
7. The selection process is designed to favor students who take the more mathematically comprehensive AMC 12A and AMC 12B contests.

=== 2001 and earlier ===
From 1998 to 2001, the following guidelines were used:

- First Group: The top 120 students.
- Second Group: The next 20 students in grades 11 and below.
- Third Group: The next 20 students in grades 10 or below.
- Fourth Group: The next 20 students in grades 9 or below.
- Fifth Group: One student from each state, one student from the combined U.S.A. Territories, and one student from the APO/FPO schools- if not represented in the first four groups.

Source: American Mathematics Competitions

=== Recent qualification indices ===
Year	AMC 12	AMC 10	Total number of qualifiers
2025	12A + (10*AIME I): 237 and above 12A + (10*AIME II): 242 and above 12B + (10*AIME I): 249.5 and above 12B + (10*AIME II): 251.5 and above	10A + (10*AIME I): 233 and above 10A + (10*AIME II): 233.5 and above 10B + (10*AIME I): 243 and above 10B + (10*AIME II): 241 and above	293 USAMO; 241 USAJMO
2024	12A + (10*AIME I): 245 and above 12A + (10*AIME II): 220 and above 12B + (10*AIME I): 248 and above 12B + (10*AIME II): 228 and above	10A + (10*AIME I): 236 and above 10A + (10*AIME II): 230 and above 10B + (10*AIME I): 232 and above 10B + (10*AIME II): 220 and above	287 USAMO; 261 USAJMO
2023	12A + (10*AIME I): 223 and above 12A + (10*AIME II): 214.5 and above 12B + (10*AIME I): 227 and above 12B + (10*AIME II): 226 and above	10A + (10*AIME I): 194 and above 10A + (10*AIME II): 188 and above 10B + (10*AIME I): 190.5 and above 10B + (10*AIME II): 180 and above	236 USAMO; 275 USAJMO
2022	12A + (10*AIME I): 222 and above 12A + (10*AIME II): 208.5 and above 12B + (10*AIME I): 227.5 and above 12B + (10*AIME II): 203 and above	10A + (10*AIME I): 203.5 and above 10A + (10*AIME II): 196.5 and above 10B + (10*AIME I): 190.5 and above 10B + (10*AIME II): 182 and above	304 USAMO; 345 USAJMO
2021	12A + (10*AIME I): 229.5 and above 12A + (10*AIME II): 238 and above 12B + (10*AIME I): 231.5 and above 12B + (10*AIME II): 238 and above	10A + (10*AIME I): 217 and above 10A + (10*AIME II): 223 and above 10B + (10*AIME I): 213 and above 10B + (10*AIME II): 214.5 and above	293 USAMO; 248 USAJMO
2020*	12A + (10*AIME I): 233.5 and above 12A + (10*AOIME): 234 and above 12B + (10*AIME I): 235 and above 12B + (10*AOIME): 234.5 and above	10A + (10*AIME I): 229.5 and above 10A + (10*AIME II): 233.5 and above 10B + (10*AIME I): 230 and above 10B + (10*AIME II): 229.5 and above	223 USAMO; 158 USAJMO
2019	12A + (10*AIME I): 220 and above 12A + (10*AIME II): 230.5 and above 12B + (10*AIME I): 230.5 and above 12B + (10*AIME II): 236 and above	10A + (10*AIME I): 209.5 and above 10A + (10*AIME II): 216.5 and above 10B + (10*AIME I): 216 and above 10B + (10*AIME II): 220.5 and above	275 USAMO; 235 USAJMO
2018	12A + (10*AIME I): 215 and above 12A + (10*AIME II): 216 and above 12B + (10*AIME I): 235 and above 12B + (10*AIME II): 230.5 and above	10A + (10*AIME I): 222 and above 10A + (10*AIME II): 222 and above 10B + (10*AIME I): 212 and above 10B + (10*AIME II): 212 and above	242 USAMO; 156 USAJMO
2017	12A + (10*AIME I): 225.5 and above 12A + (10*AIME II): 221 and above 12B + (10*AIME I): 235 and above 12B + (10*AIME II): 230.5 and above	10A + (10*AIME I): 224.5 and above 10A + (10*AIME II): 219 and above 10B + (10*AIME I): 233 and above 10B + (10*AIME II): 225 and above	280 USAMO; 208 USAJMO
2016	220.0 for USAMO with AIME I, 205.0 for USAMO with AIME II	210.5 for USAJMO with AIME I, 200.0 for USAJMO with AIME II	311 USAMO; 198 USAJMO
2015	219.0 for USAMO with AIME I, 229.0 for USAMO with AIME II	213.0 for USAJMO with AIME I, 223.5 for USAJMO with AIME II	
2014	211.5 for USAMO	211.0 for USAJMO	266 USAMO; 231 USAJMO
2013	209.0 for USAMO	210.5 for USAJMO	264 USAMO; 231 USAJMO
2012	204.5 for USAMO	204.0 for USAJMO	268 USAMO; 233 USAJMO
2011	188.0 (AIME I); 215.5 (AIME II) for USAMO	179.0 (AIME I); 196.5 (AIME II) for USAJMO	282 USAMO; 222 USAJMO
2010	208.5 (USAMO); 204.5 (USAMO—11th and 12th)	188.5 (USAJMO) or 11/15 on AIME (USAMO)	328 USAMO; 235 USAJMO
2009	201.0	7/15 on AIME AND 215.0+ on index	514
2008	204.0	6/15 on AIME AND 202.5+ on index	503
2007	197.5	6/15 on AIME AND 181.0+ on index	505
2006	217	8/15 on AIME	432
2005	233 (AIME I); 220.5 (AIME II)	9/15 on AIME	259
2004	210	7/15 on AIME	261
2003	226	8/15 on AIME	250
2002	210	6/15 on AIME	326
2001	213	7/15 on AIME	268
2000	212 (12th); 204 (11th)	9th grade: 7/15 on AIME AND 164+ on index; 10th grade: 8/15 on AIME AND 174+ on index	239

*In 2020, the AIME I took place as normal on March 11, 2020. However, the escalating COVID-19 pandemic which had just shut down most U.S. Schools forced the postponement of the AIME II, which was scheduled for March 19, and the USA(J)MO which was scheduled for mid-April. Both competitions were eventually rescheduled in June as online competitions which students participated in at home and were renamed as the AOIME (American Online Invitational Mathematics Examination) and the USO(J)MO (United States Online (Junior) Mathematical Olympiad) respectively. They were sponsored by Art of Problem Solving (AoPS).

== Test format and scoring ==
=== Post-2002 ===
Since 2002, the USAMO has been a six-question, nine-hour mathematical proof competition spread out over two days. (The IMO uses the same format.) On each day, four and a half hours are given for three questions.

Each question is graded on a scale from 0 to 7, with a score of 7 representing a proof that is mathematically sound. Thus, a perfect score is 42 points. The number of perfect papers each year has varied depending on test difficulty. The top scorers are published by MAA and the recognition changes over the years. Please refer to Award section for more details.

The scale of 0 to 7 goes as follows:

- 0 - No work, or completely trivial work
- 1-2 - Progress on the problem, but not completely solved
- 3-4 - All steps are present, but may lack clarity. (These scores are very rare.)
- 5-6 - Complete solution with minor errors
- 7 - Perfect solution

=== 1996 to 2001 ===
The test consisted of two three-problem sets. Three hours were given for each set; one set was given in the morning (9:00-12:00), and the other in the afternoon (1:00-4:00).

=== 1995 and earlier ===
The test consisted of five problems to be solved in three and a half hours (earlier, three hours). Each problem was worth 20 points, for a perfect score of 100.

== Test procedures ==
In most years, students have taken the USAMO at their respective high schools. Prior to 2002, the problems were mailed to the schools in sealed envelopes, not to be opened before the appointed time on the test day. Since 2002, test problems have been posted on the AMC website (see links below) fifteen minutes prior to the official start of the test. Student responses are then faxed back to the AMC office at the end of the testing period.

In 2002, the Akamai Foundation, as a major sponsor of the American Mathematics Competitions, invited all USAMO participants to take the test at a central event at MIT in Cambridge, Massachusetts, all expenses paid. In addition, Akamai invited all 2002 USAMO participants who were not high school seniors (approximately 160 students) to take part in an enlarged Mathematical Olympiad Program (also known as "MOP") program. Since holding this central event every year would be prohibitively expensive, it has been discontinued. In 2004 and 2005, however, funding was found to send 30 rising sophomores and juniors to MOP as well, in a program popularly called "Red MOP."

Top USAMO and USAJMO participants are selected to MOP through multiple criteria of entry. As of 2016, the IMO team members, the next approximately 18 non-graduating USAMO students, the next approximately 12 USAMO students in 9th or 10th grade, the top approximately 12 students on the USAJMO, as well as some varying number of female contestants from the USAMO or USAJMO are invited to MOP, with middle school students invited on a case-by-case basis.

== Exam content for USAMO ==
Here are the subjects on the test in different years by problem number (i.e. what subject each problem was from). Calculus, although allowed, is never required in solutions.

2026:

1. Algebra
2. Combinatorics
3. Geometry
4. Combinatorics
5. Geometry
6. Number Theory

2025:

1. Number Theory
2. Algebra
3. Combinatorics/Geometry
4. Geometry
5. Combinatorics/Number Theory
6. Combinatorics

2024:

1. Algebra/Number Theory
2. Combinatorics
3. Geometry
4. Combinatorics
5. Geometry
6. Algebra

2023:

1. Geometry
2. Algebra
3. Combinatorics
4. Number Theory
5. Combinatorics
6. Geometry

2022:

1. Combinatorics
2. Geometry
3. Algebra
4. Number Theory
5. Combinatorics
6. Combinatorics

2021:

1. Geometry
2. Combinatorics
3. Combinatorics
4. Combinatorics
5. Algebra
6. Geometry

2020:

1. Geometry
2. Combinatorics
3. Number Theory
4. Combinatorics
5. Combinatorics
6. Algebra

2019:

1. Algebra
2. Geometry
3. Number Theory
4. Combinatorics
5. Number theory
6. Algebra

2018:

1. Algebra
2. Algebra
3. Number Theory
4. Number Theory
5. Geometry
6. Algebra

2017:

1. Number Theory
2. Combinatorics
3. Geometry
4. Combinatorics
5. Combinatorics
6. Algebra

2016:

1. Combinatorics
2. Number Theory
3. Geometry
4. Algebra
5. Geometry
6. Combinatorics

2015:

1. Number Theory
2. Geometry
3. Combinatorics
4. Combinatorics
5. Number Theory
6. Algebra

2014:

1. Algebra
2. Algebra
3. Algebra
4. Combinatorics
5. Geometry
6. Number Theory

2013:

1. Geometry
2. Combinatorics
3. Combinatorics
4. Algebra
5. Number Theory
6. Geometry

2012:

1. Algebra
2. Combinatorics
3. Number Theory
4. Algebra
5. Geometry
6. Combinatorics

2011:

1. Algebra
2. Combinatorics
3. Geometry
4. Number Theory
5. Geometry
6. Algebra

2010:

1. Geometry
2. Combinatorics
3. Algebra
4. Geometry
5. Number Theory
6. Combinatorics

2009:

1. Geometry
2. Combinatorics
3. Combinatorics
4. Algebra
5. Geometry
6. Number Theory

2008:

1. Number Theory
2. Geometry
3. Combinatorics
4. Combinatorics
5. Combinatorics
6. Combinatorics

2007:

1. Algebra
2. Geometry
3. Combinatorics
4. Graph Theory
5. Number Theory
6. Geometry

2006:

1. Number Theory
2. Algebra
3. Number Theory
4. Algebra
5. Combinatorics
6. Geometry

2005:

1. Combinatorics
2. Number Theory
3. Geometry
4. Combinatorics
5. Combinatorics
6. Number Theory

2004:

1. Geometry
2. Number Theory
3. Combinatorics
4. Combinatorics
5. Algebra
6. Algebra

2003:

1. Number Theory
2. Geometry
3. Algebra
4. Geometry
5. Algebra
6. Combinatorics

2002:

1. Combinatorics
2. Algebra
3. Algebra
4. Algebra
5. Combinatorics
6. Combinatorics

2001:

1. Combinatorics
2. Geometry
3. Algebra
4. Geometry
5. Number Theory
6. Combinatorics

2000:

1. Algebra
2. Algebra
3. Combinatorics
4. Combinatorics
5. Geometry
6. Algebra

== Exam Content for USAJMO ==
Here are the subjects on the test in different years by problem number (i.e. what subject each problem was from). Calculus, although allowed, is never required in solutions.

2026:

1. Number Theory
2. Combinatorics
3. Geometry
4. Geometry
5. Combinatorics/Number Theory
6. Combinatorics/Geometry

2025:

1. Algebra
2. Number Theory
3. Combinatorics
4. Algebra
5. Geometry
6. Number Theory

2024:

1. Geometry
2. Geometry/Combinatorics
3. Algebra/Number Theory
4. Combinatorics
5. Algebra
6. Geometry

2023:

1. Algebra/Number Theory
2. Geometry
3. Combinatorics
4. Combinatorics/Game Theory
5. Combinatorics
6. Geometry

2022:

1. Algebra/Number Theory
2. Combinatorics/Graph Theory
3. Geometry/Combinatorics
4. Geometry
5. Number Theory
6. Algebra

2021:

1. Algebra
2. Geometry
3. Combinatorics
4. Geometry
5. Number Theory
6. Algebra

2020*:

1. Combinatorics
2. Geometry
3. Combinatorics
4. Geometry
5. Combinatorics
6. Algebra

2019:

1. Combinatorics
2. Algebra
3. Geometry
4. Geometry
5. Combinatorics
6. Algebra

2018:

1. Combinatorics
2. Algebra
3. Geometry
4. Geometry/Algebra
5. Number Theory
6. Combinatorics

2017:

1. Number Theory
2. Algebra
3. Geometry
4. Number Theory
5. Geometry
6. Combinatorics

2016:

1. Geometry
2. Number Theory
3. Combinatorics
4. Combinatorics
5. Geometry
6. Algebra

2015:

1. Combinatorics
2. Number Theory
3. Geometry
4. Algebra
5. Geometry
6. Combinatorics

2014:

1. Algebra
2. Geometry
3. Algebra
4. Number Theory
5. Combinatorics/Game Theory
6. Geometry

2013:

1. Number Theory
2. Combinatorics
3. Geometry
4. Combinatorics/Number Theory
5. Geometry
6. Algebra

2012:

1. Geometry
2. Algebra
3. Algebra
4. Geometry/Algebra
5. Algebra
6. Geometry

2011:

1. Number Theory
2. Algebra
3. Geometry/Algebra
4. Combinatorics
5. Geometry
6. Number theory

2010:

1. Combinatorics
2. Algebra
3. Algebra
4. Geometry
5. Combinatorics
6. Geometry

*Rescheduled as an online competition in 2020, called the USO(J)MO (United States Online (Junior) Mathematical Olympiad).

== USAMO Awards ==
- USAMO: 2022 -
1. USAMO Gold Award: at least approximately 6% of competitors (approximately 16)
2. USAMO Silver Award: at least approximately 12% of competitors (approximately 32)
3. USAMO Bronze Award: at least approximately 18% of competitors (approximately 48)
4. USAMO Honorable Mention: competitors who score 14 points or more, provided they did not receive a different award. (year 2023 - present)
- USAMO: 2021 and before
1. USAMO Winners: the top 12 performers
2. USAMO Honorable Mentions: the next approximately 12 performers

== USAJMO Awards ==
- USAJMO: 2024
1. USAJMO Top Honors: Top 9 competitors
2. USAJMO Honors: the next 48 competitors
3. USAJMO Honorable Mention: competitors who score 14 points or more, provided they did not receive a different award.
- USAJMO: 2023
1. USAJMO Top Winners: at least 12 highest scoring competitors (actual number: 13)
2. USAJMO Winners: the next approximately 20% of competitors (actual number: 36)
3. USAJMO Honorable Mention: competitors who score 14 points or more, provided they did not receive a different award.
- USAJMO: 2022
1. USAJMO Winners: approximately top 70 competitors
2. USAJMO Honorable Mentions: the next approximately 70 competitors
- USAJMO: 2021 and before
1. USAJMO Winners: the top 12 performers
2. USAJMO Honorable Mentions: the next approximately 12 performers

== See also ==
- American Mathematics Competitions
- List of mathematics competitions
