= American Mathematics Competitions =

Secondary school US competition

The American Mathematics Competitions (AMCs) are the first of a series of competitions in secondary school mathematics sponsored by the Mathematical Association of America (MAA) that determine the United States of America's team for the International Mathematical Olympiad (IMO). The selection process takes place over the course of roughly five stages. At the last stage, the US selects six members to form the IMO team.

There are three AMC competitions held each year:

- the AMC 8, for students under the age of 14.5 and in grades 8 and below
- the AMC 10, for students under the age of 17.5 and in grades 10 and below
- the AMC 12, for students under the age of 19.5 and in grades 12 and below

The AMC 8 tests mathematics through the 8th grade curriculum. Similarly, the AMC 10 and AMC 12 test mathematics through the 10th and 12th grade curriculum, respectively.

Before the 1999-2000 academic year, the AMC 8 was known as the AJHSME (American Junior High School Mathematics Examination), and the AMC 12 was known as the AHSME (American High School Mathematics Examination). There was no AMC 10 prior to the 1999-2000 academic year.

Students who perform well on the AMC 10 or AMC 12 competitions are invited to participate in the American Invitational Mathematics Examination (AIME). Students who perform exceptionally well on the AMC 12 and AIME are invited to the United States of America Mathematical Olympiad (USAMO), while students who perform exceptionally well on the AMC 10 and AIME are invited to United States of America Junior Mathematical Olympiad (USAJMO). Students who do exceptionally well on the USAMO (typically around 45 students based on score and grade level) and USAJMO (typically around the top 15 students) are invited to attend the Mathematical Olympiad Program (MOP).

== History ==
The AMC contest series includes the American Mathematics Contest 8 (AMC 8) (formerly the American Junior High School Mathematics Examination) for students in grades 8 and below, begun in 1985; the American Mathematics Contest 10 (AMC 10), for students in grades 10 and below, begun in 2000; the American Mathematics Contest 12 (AMC 12) (formerly the American High School Mathematics Examination) for students in grades 12 and below, begun in 1950; the American Invitational Mathematics Examination (AIME), begun in 1983; and the USA Mathematical Olympiad (USAMO), begun in 1972.

Years	Name	No. of questions	Comments
1950–1951	Annual High School Contest	50	New York state only
1952–1959	Annual High School Contest	50	Nationwide
1960–1967	Annual High School Contest	40	
1968–1972	Annual High School Contest	35	
1973	Annual High School Mathematics Examination	35	
1974–1982	Annual High School Mathematics Examination	30	
1983–1999	American High School Mathematics Examination	30	AIME is a middle step between AHSME and USAMO. AJHSME, now AMC 8, introduced in 1985.
2000–present	American Mathematics Competition	25	AHSME split into AMC10 and AMC12. A&B versions introduced in 2002. USAMO split into USAJMO and USAMO in 2010. AMC 10 participants who pass AIME can qualify for and participate in USAJMO, provided they don't also qualify for USAMO. USAJMO is meant to be easier than USAMO.

== Rules and scoring ==
=== AMC 8 ===
The AMC 8 is a 25 multiple-choice question, 40-minute competition designed for middle schoolers. No problems require the use of a calculator, and their use has been banned since 2008. Since 2022, the competition has been held in January. The AMC 8 is a standalone competition; students cannot qualify for the AIME via their AMC 8 score alone.

The AMC 8 is scored based on the number of questions answered correctly. There is no penalty for getting a question wrong, and each question has equal value. Thus, a student who answers 23 questions correctly and 2 questions incorrectly receives a score of 23.

==== Rankings and awards ====
Ranking

Based on questions correct:

- Distinguished Honor Roll: Top 1% (has ranged from 19–24)
- Honor Roll: Top 5% (has ranged from 19-23)

Awards

- A Certificate of Distinction is given to all students who receive a perfect score.
- An AMC 8 Winner Pin is given to the student(s) in each school with the highest score.
- The top three students for each school section will receive respectively a gold, silver, or bronze Certificate for Outstanding Achievement.
- An AMC 8 Honor Roll Certificate is given to all high scoring students.
- An AMC 8 Merit Certificate is given to high scoring students who are in 6th grade or below.

=== AMC 10 and AMC 12 ===
The AMC 10 and AMC 12 are 25 question, 75-minute multiple choice competitions in secondary school mathematics containing problems which can be understood and solved with precalculus concepts. The AMC 10 and AMC 12 are held annually in November. Calculators have not been allowed on the AMC 10/12 since 2008.

High scores on the AMC 10 or 12 can qualify the participant for the American Invitational Mathematics Examination (AIME).

The competitions are scored based on the number of questions answered correctly and the number of questions left blank. A student receives 6 points for each question answered correctly, 1.5 points for each question left blank, and 0 points for incorrect answers. Thus, a student who answers 24 correctly, leaves 1 blank, and misses 0 gets $24 \times 6 + 1.5 \times 1 = 145.5$ points. The maximum possible score is $25 \times 6 = 150$ points. In 2020, the AMC 12 had a total of 18 perfect scores between its two administrations, and the AMC 10 also had 18.

From 1974 until 1999, the competition (then known as the American High School Math Examination, or AHSME) had 30 questions and was 90 minutes long, scoring 5 points for correct answers. Originally during this time, 1 point was awarded for leaving an answer blank, however, it was changed in the late 1980s to 2 points. When the competition was shortened as part of the 2000 rebranding from AHSME to AMC, the value of a correct answer was increased to 6 points and the number of questions reduced to 25 (keeping 150 as a perfect score). In 2001, the score of a blank was increased to 2.5 to penalize guessing. The 2007 competitions were the first with only 1.5 points awarded for a blank, to discourage students from leaving a large number of questions blank in order to assure qualification for the AIME. For example, prior to this change, on the AMC 12, a student could achieve 100 points (and advance to AIME) with only 11 correct answers, presuming the remaining questions were left blank. After the change, a student must answer 14 questions correctly to reach 100 points.

The competitions have historically overlapped to an extent, with the medium-hard AMC 10 questions usually being the same as the medium-easy ones on the AMC 12. Problem 18 on the 2022 AMC 10A was the same as problem 18 on the 2022 AMC 12A. Since 2002, two AMC 10/12's are offered annually (known as the AMC 10/12A and AMC 10/12B) Students are eligible to compete in an A competition and a B competition, (e.g., the AMC 10A and the AMC 12B), though they may not take both the AMC 10 and AMC 12 from the same date. If a student participates in both competitions, they may use either score towards qualification to the AIME or USAMO/USAJMO. In 2021, the competition format was changed to occur in the Fall instead of the Spring.

==== Awards and recognition ====
Based on score achieved:

- Distinguished Honor Roll (DHR - Top 1%)
  - Historically 112.5–138 for AMC 10
  - Historically 106.5–150 for AMC 12
- AIME Floor
  - Since the 2026–2027 school year, the cutoffs are fixed at 100 for the AMC 10 and 85 for the AMC 12.
    - Historically ~96-105 for AMC 10 (Between the late 2010s and 2026, previously ~120)
    - Historically ~87-100.5 for AMC 12 (Between the late 2010s and 2026, previously ~95)

== Controversies ==
In recent years, the Mathematical Association of America (MAA) implemented policy updates following a series of exam security incidents and leaks. In 2023, an exam leak occurred in which test materials were circulated online days prior to the official testing window. Media reports and student initiatives documented further distribution in 2024, noting that test questions were offered for sale across various digital platforms, including Reddit, Discord, WeChat, and RedNote.

== See also ==
- American Invitational Mathematics Examination (AIME)
- United States of America Mathematical Olympiad (USAMO)
- Mathematical Olympiad Program (MOP)
- International Mathematical Olympiad (IMO)
- List of mathematics competitions
- Computational mathematics
