= KuzeyDoğa =

Conservation project in Turkey

- Logo of KuzeyDoğa.
- Predecessor: Kars-Iğdır Biodiversity Project (2003-2008)
- Founder: Çağan H. Şekercioğlu
- Region served: Turkey
- Fields: Conservation

KuzeyDoğa (Northeastern Nature) is a Turkish conservation non-governmental organization operating primarily in the far eastern section of the country, with a focal area ranging from the shores of the Black Sea to Mount Ağrı (Ararat).

== History ==
The organization was initially created in 2003 as the Kars-Iğdır Biodiversity Project by the biology professor Çağan H. Şekercioğlu, who subsequently founded KuzeyDoğa in January 2008.

Since 2006, the organization placed motion-triggered cameras to capture the wildlife in the Eastern Anatolian region (project 'Animal Corridor'). A bird research and education center was established in the Aras Valley at the village Yukarı Çıyrıklı (one of Turkey's two bird ringing stations that remain active yearly).

Starting in 2011, KuzeyDoğa became the first organization to track wolves in Turkey. In January 2012, the Ministry of Forest and Water Management created the country's first wildlife corridor in the Northeastern Anatolia region (81 kilometer-long, 23,533 hectares) following KuzeyDoğa's 2008 proposition.

In 2013, the organization started to monitor endangered Caucasian lynx in the Sarıkamış region. The organization asked the Ministry of Forest and Water Management to drop the Tuzluca Dam project, which threatened the wetland harboring bird wildlife in the Aras Valley. In January 2014, KuzeyDoğa reported that the wildlife at the Lake Kuyucuk was endangered due to a dramatic drop of the lake's water levels, which decreased down to 2–3 m (6.6–9.8 ft), bringing the birds in danger by predators. The vegetation on the lake's islet was destroyed by the local herdsmen to feed their livestock. The water levels drop was due to insufficient water inflow and excessive extraction of groundwater from local wells drilled by local villagers. In September 2014, an Egyptian vulture was spotted with the satellite transmitter managed by KuzeyDoğa.

In May 2020, KuzeyDoğa recorded raccoon dogs for the first time in Turkey. The animals supposedly migrated from the East through Georgia. The team was alerted by the fact that raccoon dogs and other similar animals were identified as potential carriers and spreaders of the COVID-19.

== Activities ==
KuzeyDoğa is headquartered in the major regional city of Kars. It receives funding from private donations, the government of Turkey, the United Nations and various international conservation groups, most notably the Whitley Fund for Nature and the Christensen Fund. The organization is primarily concerned with documenting and studying the migratory bird life in the region. KuzeyDoğa has partnerships with several Turkish and international organizations and universities.

Focal endeavors:

- Bird monitoring and conservation: To date, KuzeyDoğa researchers have documented more than 320 bird species in this region, more than 70% of all the bird species ever recorded across the entire country to date. The organization has operated two bird ringing (bird banding) stations in the past, including the Aras River, in Iğdır and Lake Kuyucuk stations in Kars. In addition to capturing, banding and counting birds during the spring (March–June) and fall (August–October) migrations, society technicians have also placed geolocators and satellite transmitters on various bird species ranging from small song birds to larger vultures.
- Landscape protection efforts are closely related to the organization's interest in birds. The most notable achievement is the creation/designation of 416 ha of Lake Kuyucuk (Turkish: Kuyucuk Gölü) as the Kuyucuk Lake Ramsar Wetland of International Importance in 2009. This shallow lake harbors many migratory birds of at least 229 species and has been used for many centuries by at least three surrounding villages.
- Wildlife corridors work focuses primarily on large carnivorous vertebrates and centers in and around the forested regions of the Sarıkamış-Allahuekber Mountains National Park.
- Large carnivore ecology efforts are focused on European brown bears, gray wolves and Caucasian lynx. To date, the organization has collared more than 16 bears and 11 wolves, primarily in collaboration with Josip Kusak of Zagreb University in Croatia. Animals are briefly and humanely anesthetized, fitted with temporary GPS/GSM collars and released unharmed. These tracking collars, combined with information from wildlife cameras sprinkled across the region, allow KuzeyDoğa researchers to describe the movements and home ranges of these key members of the ecosystem over the course of many months. This is the primary information, which feeds into their wildlife corridor proposals.
- Ecological restoration (tied to wetland protection and bird migration): The organization's efforts include wetland restoration projects at Kafkas University and Lake Kuyucuk, in collaboration with Sean Anderson of California State University, Channel Islands.
- Public education: Local and national efforts within Turkey and international outreach (ex: annual Bird Day at Lake Kuyucuk).
- Ecotourism: The organization contributes to the bird ecotourism in the eastern section of Turkey.
