= Beisiegel =

Beisiegel is a German surname. Notable people with the surname include:

- Isabelle Beisiegel (born 1979), Canadian golfer
- Ludwig Beisiegel (1912–1999), German field hockey player
- Mary Beisiegel (born ~1972), American mathematics educator
- Ulrike Beisiegel (born 1952), German biochemist
- Walter Beisiegel (1907–1973), English Royal Air Force officer and cricketer
