= Henry L. Alder Award =

Henry L. Alder Award for Distinguished Teaching
- Founded: January 2003
- Founders: Mathematical Association of America
- Website: https://www.maa.org/node/302

The Henry L. Alder Award for Distinguished Teaching is a national award established in 2003 by the Mathematical Association of America. The award is presented to beginning college or university mathematics faculty members to recognize success and effectiveness in undergraduate mathematics education, as well as an impact that extends beyond the faculty member's own classroom. Up to three college or university teachers are recognized each year, receiving a $1,000 award and a certificate of recognition from the MAA.

== Award recipients ==
2024

- Shelby Stanhope, United States Air Force Academy
- Haydee Lindo, Harvey Mudd College
- Axel Brandt, John Carroll University

2023

- Abraham Edwards, Lyman Briggs College, Michigan State University
- Alison Lynch, California State University, Monterey Bay
- Andrea Arauza Rivera, California State University, East Bay

2022

- Vinodh Kumar Chellamuthu, Utah Tech University
- Lauren Keough, Grand Valley State University
- Brittany Stephenson, Lewis University

2021

- Andrew Penland, Western Carolina University
- Alexander Diaz-Lopez, Villanova University
- Kim Seashore, San Francisco State University

2020

- Selenne Bañuelos, California State University Channel Islands
- Kenneth Monks, Front Range Community College- Boulder County Campus
- Brandy Wiegers, Central Washington University

2019

- PJ Couch, Lamar University
- Pamela E. Harris, Williams College
- Alicia Prieto Langarica, Youngstown State University

2018

- Chad Awtrey, Elon University
- David Clark, Grand Valley State University
- Mohamed Omar, Harvey Mudd College

2017

- Steven Klee, Seattle University
- Mary Beisiegel, Oregon State University

2016

- Dandrielle Lewis, University of Wisconsin-Eau Claire
- Jana Gevertz, College of New Jersey
- Benjamin Galluzzo, Shippensburg University

2015

- Allison Henrich, Seattle University
- Patrick Rault, State University of New York at Geneseo
- Talithia Williams, Harvey Mudd College

2014

- Dominic Klyve, Central Washington University
- Lara Pudwell, Valparaiso University

2013

- Kumer Das, Lamar University
- Christopher Storm, Adelphi University
- Rachel Levy, Harvey Mudd College

2012

- Kathryn Leonard, California State University Channel Islands
- Susan Martonosi, Harvey Mudd College
- Michael Posner, Villanova University

2011

- Alissa S. Crans, Loyola Marymount University
- Sarah Eichhorn, University of California, Irvine
- Sam Vandervelde, St. Lawrence University

2010

- Nathan Carter, Bentley University
- Kathleen Fowler, Clarkson University

2009

- Scott Annin, California State University at Fullerton
- Sommer Gentry, The United States Naval Academy
- Jennifer McLoud-Mann, University of Texas at Tyler

2008

- David Brown, Ithaca College
- Jacqueline Jensen-Vallin, Sam Houston State University
- Katherine Socha, St. Mary's College of Maryland

2007

- Timothy Chartier, Davidson College
- Satyan Devadoss, Williams College
- Darren Narayan, Rochester Institute of Technology

2006

- Lesley Ward, Harvey Mudd College
- Garikai Campbell, Swarthmore College
- Christopher N. Swanson, Ashland University

2005

- Matthew DeLong, Taylor University
- Sarah J. Greenwald, Appalachian State University
- Laura Taalman, James Madison University

2004

- Francis Edward Su, Harvey Mudd College
- Zvezdelina Stankova, Mills College
