= Julia Pevtsova =

Russian-American mathematician

Julia Pevtsova is a Russian-American mathematician who works as a professor of mathematics at the University of Washington. Her research concerns representation theory and in particular modular representation theory.

Pevtsova competed for Russia in the 1992 International Mathematical Olympiad, earning a silver medal. She earned a bachelor's degree in 1997 from Saint Petersburg State University, and completed her doctorate in 2002 at Northwestern University, under the supervision of Eric Friedlander. After postdoctoral studies at the University of Oregon, she joined the University of Washington in 2005.

In 2017, she became a fellow of the American Mathematical Society "for contributions to modular representation theory". In 2018 she won the distinguished teaching award of the Pacific Northwest Section of the Mathematical Association of America. The award cited her work teaching problem-solving to undergraduates in preparation for the William Lowell Putnam Mathematical Competition and her leadership of math circles and other activities for local secondary-school students.
