= Zvezdelina Stankova =

American mathematician (born 1969)

Zvezdelina Entcheva Stankova
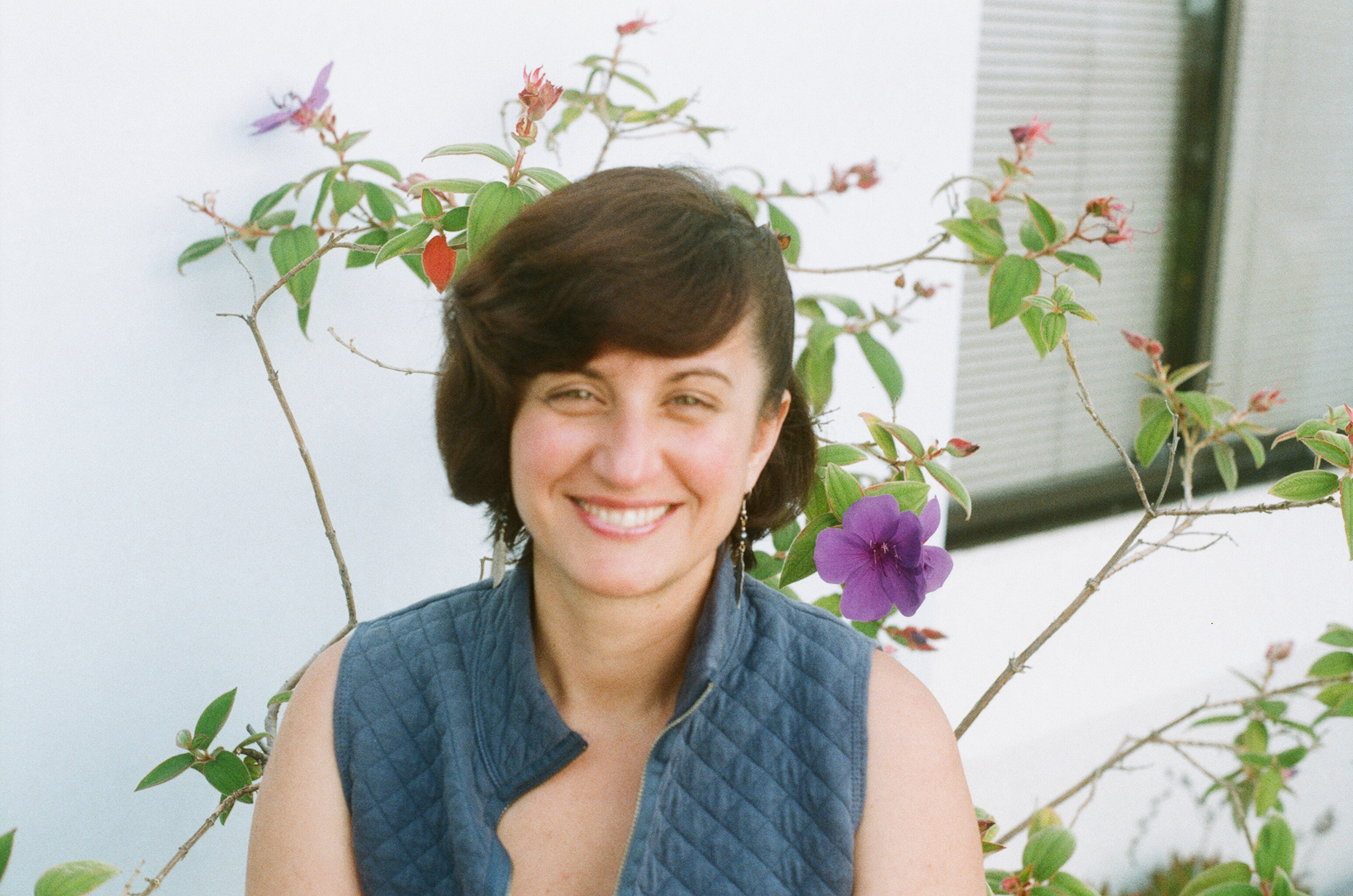
- Stankova in 2012
- Born: 15 September 1969 (age 56); Ruse, People's Republic of Bulgaria
- Education: Bryn Mawr College; Harvard University
- Known for: Skew-merged permutation Studying permutations with forbidden subsequences Establishing math circles
- Awards: Alice T. Schafer Prize (1992); Henry L. Alder Award (2004); Deborah and Franklin Haimo Awards for Distinguished College or University Teaching of Mathematics (2011)
- Scientific career
- Fields: Mathematics
- Workplaces: Mills College; University of California, Berkeley
- Doctoral advisor: Joe Harris
- Website: https://math.berkeley.edu/~stankova/

Zvezdelina Entcheva Stankova (Bulgarian: Звезделина Енчева Станкова; born 15 September 1969) is a Bulgarian and American mathematician who is a teaching professor of mathematics at the University of California, Berkeley, the founder of the Berkeley Math Circle, and an expert in the combinatorial enumeration of permutations with forbidden patterns.

== Early life ==
Stankova was born in Ruse, Bulgaria (then the People's Republic of Bulgaria). She began attending the Ruse math circle as a fifth grader, the same year she learned to solve the Rubik's Cube and began winning regional mathematics competitions. She later wrote of this experience that "if I was not a member of Ruse SMC [Students Mathematical Circle] I would not be able to make such profound achievements in mathematics". She became a student at an elite English-language high school, and competed on the Bulgarian team in the International Mathematical Olympiads in 1987 and 1988, earning silver medals both times. She entered Sofia University but in 1989, as the Iron Curtain was falling, became one of 15 Bulgarian students selected to travel to the US to complete their studies.

Stankova studied at Bryn Mawr College, completing bachelor's and master's degrees there in 1992, with Rhonda Hughes as a faculty mentor. While an undergraduate, she participated in a summer research program with Joseph Gallian at the University of Minnesota Duluth, which began her interest in permutation patterns. Next, she went to Harvard University for her doctoral studies and earned a Ph.D. there in 1997; her dissertation, entitled Moduli of Trigonal Curves, was supervised by Joe Harris. She also earned a Massachusetts teaching credential in 1997 and California's equivalent credential in 1998.

== Career ==
Stankova joined the Mills College faculty in 1999, following a postdoctoral fellowship at the University of California, Berkeley. She remained on the Mills faculty until 2016, but began in 2002 also teaching one course per year at Berkeley as a visiting professor. She joined Berkeley's mathematics department full-time in 2016, as a teaching professor.

Parallel to her work in higher education, Stankova has taught middle and high school students. She founded the Berkeley Math Circle, an after-school math enrichment program, and co-founded the Bay Area Mathematical Olympiad, both in 1998. From 1998 to 2004, she coached the US International Mathematical Olympiad team. In 2016, she founded Math Taught the Right Way, a Berkeley-based program that adapts Bulgarian middle- and high-school mathematics curricula for American students. Since 2014, she has been president of the United Math Circles Foundation, the nonprofit umbrella organization of the Berkeley Math Circle. She has also served on the advisory board of the Proof School in San Francisco.

Since June 2026, Stankova has been a prominent advocate for reforms in undergraduate admissions. She co-authored an open letter, signed by thousands of UC faculty members, urging the university to reinstate an admissions testing policy it had rescinded in 2020. She has represented the letter's stance in news media and before the UC Board of Regents. She drew criticism in August 2026 following reports she had used generative AI to edit her public statements. She subsequently discussed AI, including its utility and danger for higher education, during a live interview with Greta van Susteren.

== Contributions ==
In the theory of permutation patterns, Stankova is known for proving that the permutations with the forbidden pattern 1342 are equinumerous with the permutations with forbidden pattern 2413, an important step in the enumeration of permutations avoiding a pattern of length 4.

The Berkeley Math Circle, which Stankova founded, was only the second math circle in the US (after one in Boston); following its success, over 100 other circles have been created, and Stankova has assisted in the formation of many of them.

Since 2013, Stankova has been featured in several videos on the mathematics-themed YouTube channel "Numberphile".

== Publications ==
With Tom Rike, she is co-editor of two books about her work with the Berkeley Math Circle, A Decade of the Berkeley Math Circle: The American Experience (Vol. I, 2008, Vol. II, 2014).

== Awards and honors ==
Stankova received the Alice T. Schafer Prize in 1992, while an undergraduate. Awarded by the Association for Women in Mathematics, the prize recognized her research in combinatorics and her American Mathematical Society paper on forbidden sequences, work her advisor called "strikingly original."

For her teaching, Stankova received the Mathematical Association of America's award for early-career teaching, the Henry L. Alder Award, in 2004. Among that award's first two recipients, she was credited with "doubling the number of mathematics majors at Mills College."

She then received, in 2011, the Mathematical Association of America's most competitive award for teaching: the Deborah and Franklin Tepper Haimo Award. The award recognized "her teaching ability, her enthusiasm for mathematics, and her capacity to dramatically change [students'] attitudes toward mathematics and their perceptions of their own mathematical abilities."

Citing student reviews, Princeton Review included Stankova in its 2012 guide, "The Best 300 Professors." Berkeley students selected Stankova, during her first full year teaching there, to receive the Mathematics Undergraduate Student Association's Distinguished Teaching & Service Award in 2017.

From 2009 to 2012 she was the Frederick A. Rice Professor of Mathematics at Mills College.
