= Sean Anderson =

Sean Anderson may refer to:

- Sean Anderson (scientist), American conservation biologist
- Big Sean (born 1988), American rapper
- Sean Anderson, bass player in Finger Eleven
- Sean Anderson, a character in the 2008 film Journey to the Center of the Earth and its 2012 sequel Journey 2: The Mysterious Island
- Sean Larry Anderson, Citizens for Constitutional Freedom militant in the occupation of the Malheur National Wildlife Refuge

== See also ==
- Shawn Anderson (born 1968), Canadian ice hockey player
- Anderson (surname)
