= Paul Zeitz =

American mathematician (born 1958)

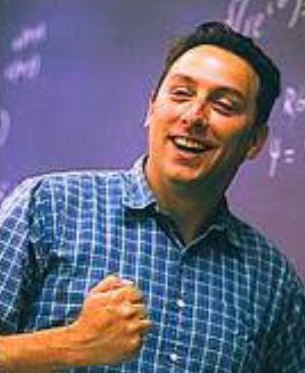
- Born: July 5, 1958
- Education: Harvard University (BA, 1981); UC Berkeley (PhD, 1992)
- Awards: Deborah and Franklin Haimo Awards for Distinguished College or University Teaching of Mathematics
- Scientific career
- Fields: History; Mathematics
- Institutions: University of San Francisco
- Thesis: Rank-One Actions (1992)
- Doctoral advisor: Jacob Feldman
- Website: www.usfca.edu/faculty/paul-zeitz

Paul Andrew Zeitz (born July 5, 1958) is a professor of mathematics at the University of San Francisco who works primarily in math enrichment.

== Early life and education ==
In 1974, Paul Zeitz won the USA Mathematical Olympiad (USAMO) and was a member of the first American team to participate in the International Mathematical Olympiad (IMO). The following year he graduated from Stuyvesant High School.

In 1981, he graduated from Harvard University with a Bachelor of Arts in history. After graduating he taught high school math for six years in San Francisco and Colorado Springs. He then went to UC Berkeley and obtained a PhD in mathematics in 1992.

== Career ==
After graduating from UC Berkeley, Zeitz became a professor at the University of San Francisco.

In 2015, Zeitz co-founded Proof School, which is a private school for middle and high school grade levels that is focused on math. Proof School teaches mathematics from the perspective that it is a "joyous art form." Zeitz also co-founded the Bay Area Mathematical Olympiad in 1999 and the San Francisco Math Circle in 2005. As of 2026, he is president of the Organization for Mathematical Engagement & Growth in America (OMEGA).

== Awards and honors ==
In 2003, Zeitz received from the Mathematical Association of America one of the Deborah and Franklin Haimo Awards for Distinguished College or University Teaching of Mathematics.

Zeitz has a lecture series called Art and Craft of Mathematical Problem Solving that he made for The Teaching Company on their platform The Great Courses Plus.
