= Mandelbrot =

Mandelbrot may refer to:

- Benoit Mandelbrot (1924–2010), a mathematician associated with fractal geometry
- Mandelbrot set, a fractal popularized by Benoit Mandelbrot
- Mandelbrot Competition, a mathematics competition
- Mandelbrot (cookie), dessert associated with Eastern European Jews
- Szolem Mandelbrojt, a Polish-French mathematician
