= Martonosi =

Martonosi is a Hungarian toponymic surname. Notable people with the surname include:

- György Martonosi (born 1953), mayor of Maroslele in Hungary
- Margaret Martonosi, American computer scientist
- Susan Martonosi, American mathematician
