= Sam Vandervelde =

American mathematician

- Born: February 12, 1971 (age 55)
- Education: University of Chicago
- Known for: Mandelbrot Competition, Proof School
- Scientific career
- Fields: Mathematics
- Workplaces: Art of Problem Solving, Proof School

Samuel Kendrick Vandervelde (born 12 February 1971) is a mathematician who, along with Sandor Lehoczky and Richard Rusczyk, created the Mandelbrot Competition, and is listed first under "Thanks" in the mathematical textbook The Art of Problem Solving.

== Contributions to mathematics ==
Vandervelde contributes problems to the USA Math Olympiad. He was a member of the 1989 United States International Mathematical Olympiad team. He was a grader at the Mathematical Olympiad Program, an intensive summer camp that prepares top high school students for the International Math Olympiad. Vandervelde founded the Stanford Math Circle. He was on the math faculty at St. Lawrence University from 2007 to 2015, and is currently the Head of School and math teacher at Proof School, a private day school in San Francisco for kids who love math. He is also a regular instructor at and board member of MathPath, and has published two books, Bridge to Higher Mathematics and Circle in a Box. His educational work has been recognized by the Mathematical Association of America's Edyth May Sliffe Award for high school teaching (2000) and the Henry L. Alder Award for collegiate teaching (2011).

== Interests ==
His other interests include playing soccer, spending time with his two sons, and cooking. He attended Amherst County High School. He received his undergraduate degree from Swarthmore College and doctoral degree from the University of Chicago in June 2004. He currently resides in California. He is married to Eunice Cheung.

== See also ==
- Art of Problem Solving
- Mandelbrot Competition
