= Benjamin Galluzzo =

American mathematician

- Education: University of Iowa
- Known for: STEM Education
- Scientific career
- Fields: Mathematics
- Workplaces: Clarkson University
- Doctoral advisor: Lihe Wang

Benjamin Galluzzo is a Math modeling educator, researcher and enthusiast. As of July 2024, he is the Executive Director of the Consortium for Mathematics and Its Applications (COMAP, Inc). Previously, he was an associate professor in the Institute for STEM Education at Clarkson University.

== Professional career ==
Galluzzo received his PhD in applied mathematical and computational sciences from the University of Iowa in 2011. His dissertation, A finite-difference based approach to solving the subsurface fluid flow equation in heterogeneous media, was supervised by Lihe Wang. He received a master's degree in mathematical finance from Boston University. His research focuses on the development of strategies and best practices for bringing innovation and active learning into K-16 STEM classrooms, with particular emphasis on mathematical modeling.

== Awards and honours ==
Galluzzo was awarded the Henry L. Alder Award from the Mathematical Association of America in 2016.
