= Sarah J. Greenwald =

American mathematician

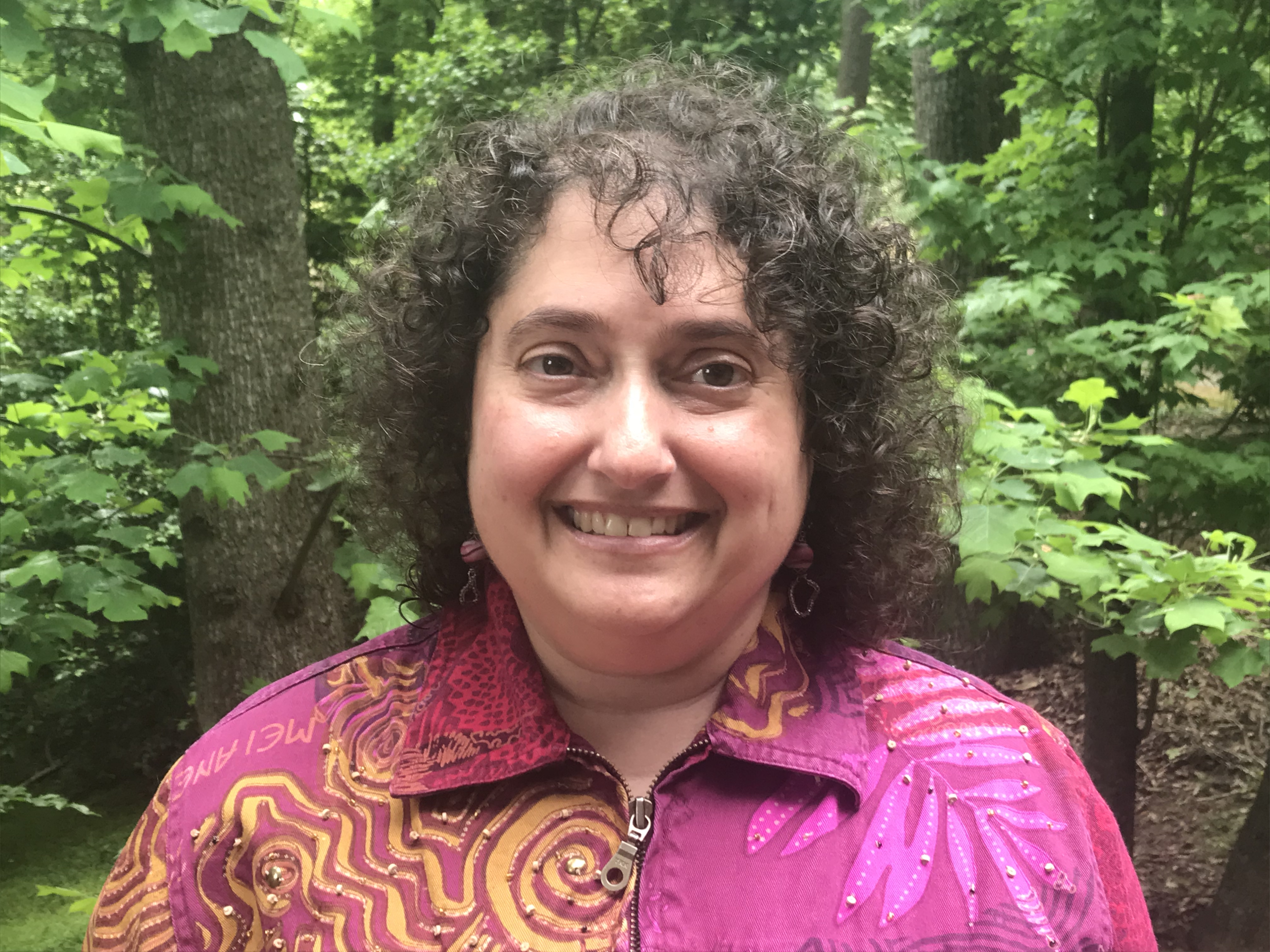
- Photo by Joel Landsberg, May 2021
- Born: September 10, 1969 (age 56); Charlotte, North Carolina, U.S.
- Education: University of Pennsylvania, PhD, 1998, Union College, BS
- Known for: Riemannian Geometry, Mathematics and Society
- Awards: MAA Henry L. Alder Award; MAA Pólya Lecturer; AWM Service Award; AWM Fellow
- Scientific career
- Fields: Mathematics
- Workplaces: Appalachian State University
- Thesis: Diameters of Spherical Alexandrov Spaces and Constant Curvature One Orbifolds
- Doctoral advisor: Wolfgang Ziller

Sarah J. Greenwald is professor of mathematics at Appalachian State University and faculty affiliate of gender, women's and sexuality studies.

== Research ==
Greenwald's research interests include geometry and the scholarship of teaching and learning. She also investigates connections between mathematics and society, such as women, minorities and popular culture. For example, she was part of a team that looked into allusions to mathematics in The Simpsons.

== Education ==
In 1991, Greenwald graduated summa cum laude with honors in mathematics from Union College with a BS degree. In 1998, she earned a PhD in mathematics at the University of Pennsylvania in Philadelphia, Pennsylvania. Her thesis in Riemannian geometry was entitled Diameters of Spherical Alexandrov Spaces and Constant Curvature One Orbifolds and was supervised by Wolfgang Ziller

== Career ==
Greenwald is a professor of mathematics at Appalachian State University and faculty affiliate of the gender, women's and sexuality studies program there. She has published numerous articles and books in the areas of Riemannian geometry, math education, and math in society. Greenwald has been trying to get young women in Girl Scouts interested in STEM. She and Appalachian State colleagues Amber Mellon and Jill Thomley have created a merit badge in mathematics to foster interest in mathematics. Greenwald has also created a series of short video interviews of women in STEM who were former Girl Scout members. This is a work in progress. Greenwald was elected in 2020 to serve as Member at Large of the Council of the American Mathematical Society during 2021–2024.

== Honors ==
Greenwald was a 2005 winner of the Henry L. Alder Award for Distinguished Teaching by a Beginning College or University Mathematics Faculty Member of the Mathematical Association of America (MAA). In 2017, Greenwald was selected as a plenary speaker at spring southeast section meeting of the MAA at Clemson University in March 2018. She received the AWM Service Award in 2018 for her work on the executive committee and as associate editor of the AWM newsletter. In 2020 she was named a Fellow of the Association for Women in Mathematics. Her citation reads "For her creative and effective efforts to spark interest in mathematics among young people, especially girls; for her extensive contributions to advancing women in mathematics through writing, lectures and working with the AWM and other professional societies; and for her mentorship of students". The Mathematical Association of America selected Greenwald as a George Pólya Lecturer from 2021 to 2022.

== Publications ==
Greenwald co-edited with Jill Thomley the 3-volume Encyclopedia of Mathematics & Society, which was named a "Best Reference of 2011" by Library Journal and was reviewed extensively. She also co-edited the 2018 Springer volume Women in Mathematics: Celebrating the Centennial of the Mathematical Association of America. She was part of the cast in 'Futurama': Bite My Shiny Metal X and served as a consultant on Flatland: The Movie.
