= Proof School =

Location
- 221 Main Street; San Francisco, California; USA; 37.790423°N 122.392138°W

Information
- Type: Private School; Secondary
- Founder: Ian Brown, Paul Zeitz, and Dennis Leary
- Head teacher: Sam Vandervelde
- Faculty: 28
- Teaching staff: 26
- Grades: 6–12
- Enrollment: 135
- Campus: Urban
- Accreditation: Western Association of Schools and Colleges
- Website: http://proofschool.org

Proof School is a secondary school in San Francisco that offers a mathematics-focused liberal arts education. Currently, 135 students in grades 6–12 are enrolled in Proof School for the academic year (2026-2027).

The school was co-founded by Dennis Leary, Ian Brown, and Paul Zeitz, the chair of mathematics at University of San Francisco. The school opened in the fall of 2015 with 45 students in grades 6–10. The curriculum is inspired by math circles, which emphasizes communication and working together to solve math problems.

== Academics ==
Proof School is a full-curriculum day school that emphasizes communication, collaboration, and problem-solving. The school is accredited by Western Association of Schools and Colleges.

The school year is divided into 4 blocks, each of which consists of 7–8 normal academic weeks and a build week.

Each student has 5 courses: 4 morning courses that vary across grades, and a math class. The morning courses meet twice a week for 80 minutes per class. The math courses meet for two hours every day in the afternoon, with middle school students having two for one hour each.

== Extracurricular activities ==
Proof School currently has a number of internal clubs, and used to have a Zero Robotics team called Proof Robotics. The team qualified for the competition finals and was the leading member of the alliance Hit or Miss with the following teams: Crab Nebula from Liveo Cecioni in Livorno, Italy and Rock Rovers from Council Rock High School South in Holland, PA, USA. Hit or Miss placed 2nd place internationally and performed one of the first satellite hookings aboard the ISS.

Students from Proof School have placed highly in a number of math competitions, including Hannah Fox winning the European Girls' Mathematical Olympiad, narrowly missing qualification for the International Mathematical Olympiad in 2024. In 2025, she earned a gold medal at the EGMO, and she won a silver medal at the IMO. In addition, nearly every year, a Proof School student has qualified for the United States of America Mathematical Olympiad. One student attended the Research Science Institute and was selected among the top 5 research papers completed by participants.

Students have also placed highly in other academic competitions. Multiple students have won the Caroline D. Bradley Scholarship. In the Regeneron Science Talent Search, two Proof School students have been named finalists and three have been named scholars.
