= Alicia Prieto Langarica =

American applied mathematician

- Education: University of Texas, Arlington (Ph.D); University of Texas, Dallas (BS)
- Awards: Henry L. Alder Award for Distinguished Teaching; 25 Under 35 MVP Award
- Scientific career
- Fields: Mathematics
- Workplaces: Youngstown State University
- Thesis: From Discrete to Continuous Models of Cell Movement: An Application to Medical Implants (2012)
- Doctoral advisor: Hristo Venelinov Kojouharov

Alicia Prieto Langarica is an American applied mathematician and professor of mathematics at Youngstown State University.

== Education and career ==
Prieto Langarica is the granddaughter of Mexican footballer Max Prieto. She is a graduate of the University of Texas at Dallas, and received her PhD in Applied Mathematics from University of Texas at Arlington in 2012. Her dissertation, From Discrete to Continuous Models of Cell Movement: An Application to Medical Implants was completed under the guidance of Hristo Venelinov Kojouharov.

She became an assistant professor of mathematics at Youngstown State University faculty in 2012, after she finished her doctorate.

== Contributions ==
Prieto Langarica's research focuses on the intersection of mathematics and biology, specifically problems related to the medical field.

She is one of four co-founders of Lathisms, a website that showcases Hispanic and Latinx mathematicians, their research, and their contributions.

In 2019, she became one of the associate directors of Project NExT, a program of the Mathematical Association of America to mentor new doctorates in mathematics.

During the COVID-19 pandemic, she organized events to give students food during shutdown, focusing particularly on the needs of international students stuck in university housing.

== Awards and honors ==
Langarica won the Henry L. Alder Award for Distinguished Teaching from the Mathematical Association of America in 2019. She also won the 25 Under 35 Award in 2017, and was nominated for the Athena Award in 2019. She competed for five years in the Mexican Mathematical Olympiad, finishing in first place in two different years.
