= CSU Channel Islands University Park =

Includes wetlands, hills, trails, a model boat pond, and model airplane field

Coordinates: 34.17842°N 119.02882°W

CSU Channel Islands University Park, sometimes abbreviated CSUCI Park, is a park adjacent to and owned by California State University, Channel Islands. It is usually closed to vehicles, but the public is welcome to explore by foot. There is a dirt parking area just outside the gate.

The area was formerly known as Camarillo Regional Park. It includes wetlands, hills, trails, the Scary dairy, a model boat pond, and an actively used model airplane field and runway. Calleguas Creek forms the northern border of the park, and the foothills of the Santa Monica Mountains form the southern edge of the park.

For many years plans and proposals were made to develop the land into something more financially beneficial to the local governments such as a golf course or outdoor amphitheater, but none of these were carried out, and in the past few years the public has become more welcome to the area for day use. In 2012, model planes were banned from the park, as a fire risk. In 2013, the park was affected by the Springs Fire and closed for a time.

Firearms of all kinds are illegal within the park as noted by the sign at the gate.
