= Lake Kuyucuk =

Lake in Kars, Turkey

- Kuyucuk Gölü (Turkish)
- Location of Lake Kuyucuk in Turkey.
- Location: Arpaçay, Kars Province, Turkey
- Coordinates: 40°44′20″N 43°27′15″E
- Basin countries: Turkey
- Surface area: 245 km^{2} (95 sq mi)
- Max. depth: 13 m (43 ft)
- Water volume: 1.73 km^{3} (0.42 cu mi)
- Surface elevation: 1,627 m (5,338 ft)
- Settlements: Kuyucuk village

Ramsar Wetland
- Official name: Lake Kuyucuk
- Designated: 28 August 2009
- Reference no.: 1890

Lake Kuyucuk (Turkish: Kuyucuk Gölü), is a small shallow lake located in Arpaçay district of Kars Province in the Eastern Anatolia region of Turkey. It has an area of 245 ha (2.45 km^{2}) and a maximum depth at 13 m (43 ft). The lake area is an internationally recognized Ramsar site, important for its ornithofauna, and a tourist wildlife reserve.

== Geology ==
The Kalkankale Formation, consisting of old sandstone, mudstone and claystone dating back to early Pliocene period, underlies wide areas at Lake Kuyucuk and the surrounding landscape, and forms the flat and low-sloped terrain of the region. Elevations north of the lake are formed by agglomerate, tuff and andesite of early Pliocene old Kura volcanic rocks while the southwestern elevations are formed by tuff, andesite, pearlite, pumice and obsidian of Dumanlıdağ pyroclastic rocks.

== Topography ==
Büyükalamet Heights 1,676 m (5,499 ft), Küçükalamet Heights 1,657 m (5,436 ft), Kızılgüney Heights 1,646 m (5,400 ft) and Uzungüney Heights 1,660 m (5,450 ft) in the north, Alaca Heights 1,693 m (5,554 ft) in the west and Cadalı Heights 1,772 m (5,814 ft), Yumru Heights 1,656 m (5,433 ft) and Mevzili Heights 1,655 m (5,430 ft) in the southwest are the elevations around the lake making up the landscape's topography.

== Flora ==
At an elevation of 1,627 m (5,338 ft), the lake region has two ecosystems, steppe and wetland. The wetland flora are free-floating aquatic plants from the duckweed family (Lemna), common reed (Phragmites australis) and rushes (Juncus) while the steppe flora are shrubs and herbs (Astragalus, Onobrychis), vetches (Vicia), daisy (Artemisia), common dandelion (Taraxacum officinale) and alsike clover (Trifolium hybridum).

The globally threatened plant species grass (Elymus sosnowskyi), which is endemic to Turkey, grows here.

== Fauna ==
Lake Kuyucuk is a wetland site for at least 233 bird species, and is a Ramsar site designated as of international importance in 2009, stretching over an area of 416 ha (4.16 km^{2}). It is Turkey's thirteenth Ramsar site, and the first one in eastern Turkey. The lake has great ornithological importance, being on the African-Eurasian flyway of migratory birds. It has been recognized by BirdLife International as an Important Bird Area in 2004. In the fall, up to 45,000 birds stop over at the lake. An artificial islet on the lake was formed in 2009 to provide a safe breeding place for bird species and to help protect them from predators.

The Ramsar site harbors bird species such as ruddy shelduck (Tadorna ferruginea), the globally endangered white-headed duck (Oxyura leucocephala), vulnerable red-breasted goose (Branta ruficollis), vulnerable velvet scoter (Melanitta fusca), western marsh harrier (Circus aeruginosus), common crane (Grus grus), black-winged stilt (Himantopus himantopus), Eurasian coot (Fulica atra), black-necked grebe (Podiceps nigricollis), common starling (Sturnus vulgaris) and greylag goose (Anser anser).

KuzeyDoğa, a Turkish non-governmental organization for ecological research and community-based nature conservation, has operated a station at the lake to carry out birdwatching, bird ringing and bird counting. Lake Kuyucuk hosted Kars' first bird ringing station, where over 22,500 birds of 170 species were ringed until January 2010. Bird ringing starts in April. In 2011, a birdwatching tower was built at the lake. In September 2004, over 20,000 ruddy shelduck, which makes out almost 12% of the world population, were observed on the lake in just one day.

Other notable fauna found around the lake are the mammal species red fox (Vulpes vulpes), Nehring's blind mole rat (Spalax nehringi), southern vole (Microtus levis) and marbled polecat (Vormela peregusna), the amphibians European green toad (Bufo viridis) and marsh frog (Pelophylax ridibundus) as well as the reptile species sand lizard (Lacerta agilis).

The highly acidic water of the lake does not support fish species.

== Climate ==
The Lake Kuyucuk and its surroundings are situated in the coldest zone of Eastern Anatolia characterized with harsh continental climate. Winters are long and very cold, summers are moderate, even coolish. Maximum precipitation is observed in May while in January precipitation is at minimum.

== Wildlife endangered ==
By January 2014, it was reported by KuzeyDoğa that the wildlife at the lake is endangered due to dropping water levels. The lake's water level decreased down to 2–3 m (6.6–9.8 ft). That resulted in connecting of the artificial breeding islet with the lake shore at some places, which brings the birds in danger by predators. Moreover, the vegetation on the islet was destroyed as it was used by the local herdsmen as fodder for their livestock. The negative change of the ecosystem was caused mostly by water levels dropping due to insufficient water inflow and excessive extraction of groundwater from local wells drilled by the villagers. In addition, the creek feeding the lake is used as watering trough for livestock by blocking their flow.

KuzeyDoğa proposed to set up a planning for water supply in the basin and to immediately reform the islet by digging a ditch around.

== Tourism ==
The European Destinations of Excellence (EDEN) of the European Commission has listed Lake Kuyucuk as a notable tourist wildlife reserve since 2009. In 2012, a tourism center was built in Kuyucuk Village near the lake to serve for ecotourism. Since 2011, an annual two-day birdwatching festival is held in mid June.

The nearest populated place is Kuyucuk village, 1 km (0.62 mi) west of the lake. Until 1920, the village was inhabited by Molokans, members of a Christian sect. Later, Karapapaks, a Turkic-speaking sub-ethnic group of Azerbaijanis, settled in the village. A village school building, built by Molokans in 1907, is still intact. From the 1909-built three-story Russian orthodox church, only the first floor has survived. Other buildings, preserved from the Molokan times, are the village chambers.

Nature tourists and birdwatchers come to Lake Kuyucuk between the beginning of spring and the end of fall. The site is also visited by students of local schools and colleges on special days like World Biodiversity Day, World Environment Day, International Migratory Bird Day and Birdwatching Day.

The ruined medieval Armenian city-site Ani and the ruins of an 11th-century Shaddadids mosque, the Manucehr mosque (Menucehr camii) within the site of Ani, are notable tourist attractions in the vicinity.

Lake Çıldır is another tourist destination in the region.

== Access ==
Lake Kuyucuk is accessible through the state road D.060, which crosses over the northern part of the lake. It is about 40 km (25 mi) northeast of Kars and 15 km (9.3 mi) west of Akyaka, Kars. The road through Kuyucuk village is used to get to the lake.
