= Mathcounts =

School mathematics competition in the United States

- Mathcounts logo
- Formation: 1983; 43 years ago
- Type: Foundation
- Headquarters: Alexandria, Virginia
- Location: United States
- Executive Director: Kristen Chandler
- Co-founder: Donald G. Weinert
- Main organ: National Staff
- Website: mathcounts.org

Mathcounts, stylized as MATHCOUNTS, is a nonprofit organization that provides extracurricular mathematics programs for grades 6 through 8 in every U.S. state, the District of Columbia, Puerto Rico, Guam, the U.S. Virgin Islands, Department of Defense schools, and State Department schools. Its mission is to provide engaging math programs for middle school students of all ability levels to build confidence and improve attitudes about math and problem-solving.

In Mathcounts, testing is conducted in four separate rounds: the Sprint, Target, Team, and Countdown rounds.

The Sprint Round consists of 30 problems to be completed in 40 minutes. This round tests competitors' accuracy and speed. As a result of the difficulty and time constraint, many competitors do not finish all the problems in the Sprint Round.

The Target Round consists of eight problems presented in sets of two, with each set having a six-minute time limit. Calculators are permitted. This round tests competitors' accuracy and problem-solving skills. The problems get progressively more difficult, and even with the aid of a calculator, students commonly leave questions blank.

The Team Round consists of 10 problems to be solved in 20 minutes. Calculators are permitted. Only the four students on a school's or state's team may take this round officially. The Team Round tests the team's collaboration and problem-solving skills.

The Countdown Round is optional. Competitors buzz in to answer questions. Execution of the Countdown Round varies, with some locations using a one-on-one format and some having multiple competitors at the buzzers at once. The Countdown Round may be official (affecting competitors' rankings) or unofficial. It tests competitors' speed and reflexes. The Countdown Round determines the National Champion at Mathcounts Nationals.

Topics covered in the competition include geometry, counting, probability, number theory, and algebra.

== History ==
Mathcounts was started in 1983 by the National Society of Professional Engineers, the National Council of Teachers of Mathematics, and CNA Insurance to increase middle school interest in mathematics. The first national-level competition was in 1984. The Mathcounts Competition Series spread quickly in middle schools, and today it is the best-known middle school mathematics competition. In 2007, Mathcounts launched the National Math Club as a noncompetitive alternative to the Competition Series. In 2011, Mathcounts launched the Math Video Challenge Program, which was discontinued in 2023.

2020 was the only year since 1984 in which a national competition was not held, due to the COVID-19 pandemic. The "MATHCOUNTS Week" event featuring problems from the 2020 State Competition was held on the Art of Problem Solving website as a replacement. The 2021 National Competition was held online.

Mathcounts sponsors include RTX Corporation, U.S. Department of Defense STEM, BAE Systems, Northrop Grumman, National Society of Professional Engineers, 3M, Texas Instruments, Art of Problem Solving, Bentley Systems, Carina Initiatives, National Council of Examiners for Engineering and Surveying, CNA Financial, Google, Brilliant, and Mouser Electronics.

== Competition Series ==
The Competition Series has four levels: school, chapter, state, and national. Students progress based on performance at the previous level. As the levels progress, the problems become more challenging. Each level has many rounds, always including a Sprint Round (30 questions, 40 minutes) and a Target Round (4 pairs of harder problems with calculator use, 6 minutes each pair).

All students are either school-based competitors or non-school competitors ("NSCs"). Most students participate through their schools, starting with a school-level competition. A student whose school does not participate in the Competition Series starts at the chapter level as an NSC, competing individually.

=== School level ===
School coaches select up to 14 students from their school to advance to the chapter competition, with four students competing on the official school team. The rest compete individually.

=== Chapter level ===
All qualifying students compete individually. Students on an official school team also compete as a team. The Countdown Round is optional and can be used to determine top individuals or as an unofficial round. The top few teams and around a half-dozen other individuals advance to the state competition. The exact number of qualifiers varies by region.

=== State level ===
All qualifying students compete individually. Students on a qualifying school team also compete as a team. The Countdown Round is optional and can be used to determine top individuals or as an unofficial round. The top four individuals represent the state at the national competition, and the winning school team's coach coaches the state team. Some states have universities that give scholarships to the top individuals or other special awards.

=== National level ===
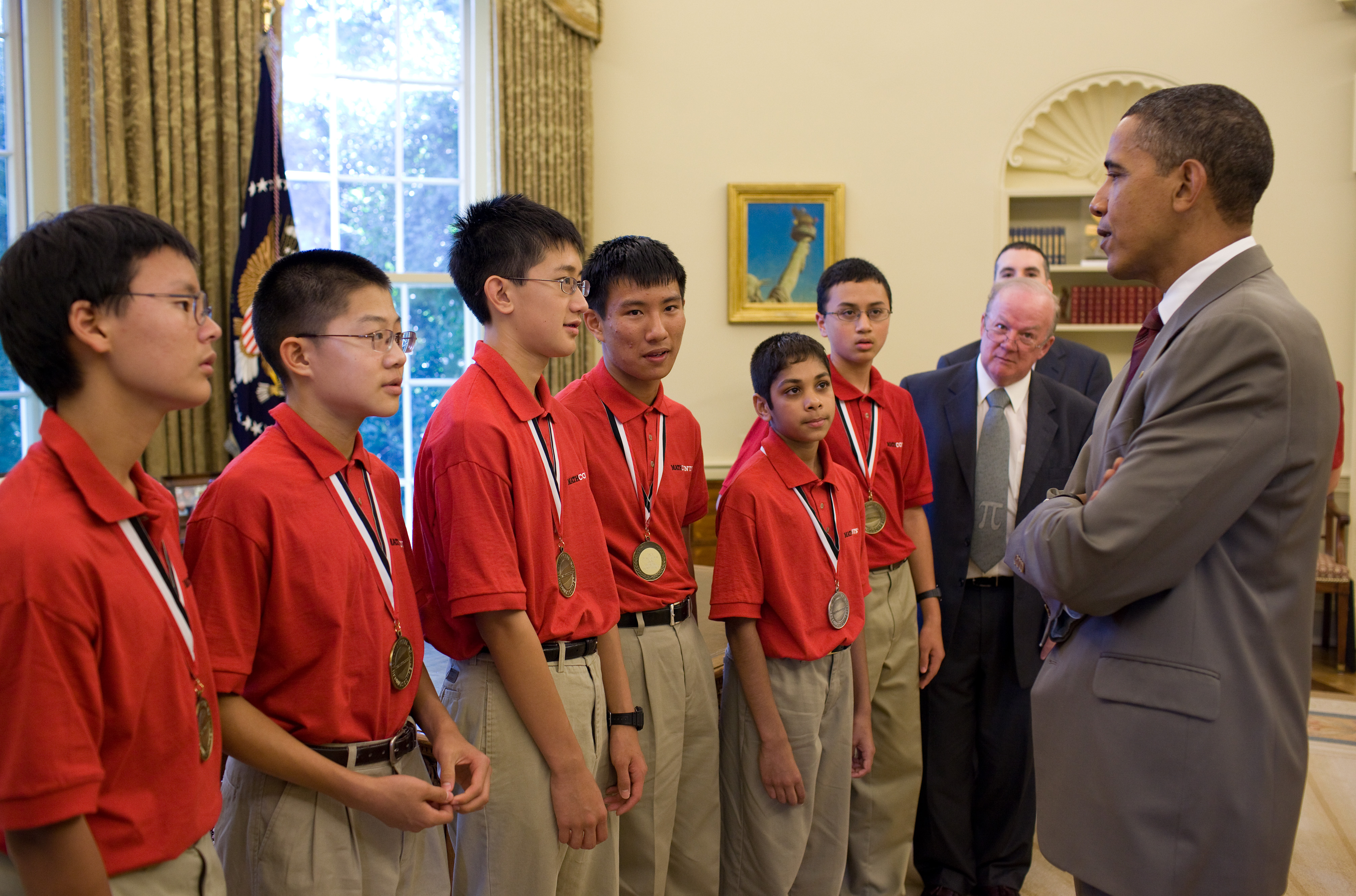
President Barack Obama meets award recipients of the 2010 Mathcounts National Competition in the Oval Office Monday, June 28, 2010.

Qualifying students and coaches receive an all-expenses-paid trip to the national competition. The competition typically lasts 3–4 days on Mother's Day weekend. The state team coach supervises the team. The students compete individually for the title of national champion. They also compete as a team to represent their state.

The 12 highest-scoring individuals advance to the Countdown Round, where a bracket-style single-elimination format is used. The winner of this round is declared the National Champion.

Scholarships and prizes are awarded to the top individuals and teams. Prizes have included trips to Space Camp or to the White House to meet the President of the United States.

== National Math Club ==
In addition to the Competition Series program, students may participate in the National Math Club program.

The National Math Club program allows schools and non-school groups to start a math club for free. Upon registering, club leaders earn free online access to dozens of games, explorations, and problem sets.

Clubs that meet at least five times during the program year can achieve Silver Level Status, and clubs that complete a creative and collaborative project can achieve Gold Level Status. Clubs that achieve Silver Level and Gold Level can earn prizes and recognition.

== Other programs ==
=== Alumni scholarships ===
Each year, Mathcounts awards two types of scholarships to alumni who participated in at least one Mathcounts program during middle school. The Mathcounts Alumni Scholarship is awarded to alumni whose Mathcounts experience was extremely influential, and the Community Coaching Scholarship is awarded to alumni who start Mathcounts programs at underserved schools.

=== Math Video Challenge ===
In 2011, Mathcounts started the Reel Math Challenge, later renamed the Math Video Challenge. It allowed students in teams of four to create a video that explained the solution to a problem from the Mathcounts School Handbook in a real-world scenario. The program was discontinued in 2023, but the National Math Club offers a similar video project.

== Competition winners ==
Below is a table including each year's winning individual, team, and coach, and the location of the national competition.

Year	Individual winner	State-team winner	Winning-state coach	Competition location	Refs
1984	Michael Edwards, Texas	Virginia (1)	Joan Armistead	Washington, D.C.	
1985	Timothy Kokesh, Oklahoma	Florida	Burt Kaufman	Washington, D.C.	
1986	Brian David Ewald, Florida	California (1)		Washington, D.C.	
1987	Russell Mann, Tennessee	New York (1)	Robert C. Bieringer	Washington, D.C.	
1988	Andrew Schultz, Illinois	New York (2)		Washington, D.C.	
1989	Albert Kurz, Pennsylvania	North Carolina	Barbara Sydnor	Washington, D.C.	
1990	Brian Jenkins, Arkansas	Ohio		Washington, D.C.	
1991	Jonathan L. Weinstein, Massachusetts	Alabama	Cindy Breckenridge	Washington, D.C.	
1992	Andrei C. Gnepp, Ohio	California (2)		Washington, D.C.	
1993	Carleton Bosley, Kansas	Kansas		Washington, D.C.	
1994	William O. Engel, Illinois	Pennsylvania (1)	Matt Zipin	Washington, D.C.	
1995	Richard Reifsnyder, Kentucky	Indiana (1)		Washington, D.C.	
1996	Alexander Schwartz, Pennsylvania	Pennsylvania (2)		Washington, D.C.	
1997	Zhihao Liu, Wisconsin	Massachusetts (1)	Heidi Johnson	Washington, D.C.	
1998	Ricky Liu, Massachusetts	Wisconsin		Washington, D.C.	
1999	Po-Ru Loh, Wisconsin	Massachusetts (2)	Evagrio Mosca	Washington, D.C.	
2000	Ruozhou Jia, Illinois	California (3)		Washington, D.C.	
2001	Ryan Ko, New Jersey	Virginia (2)	Barbara Burnett	Washington, D.C.	
2002	Albert Ni, Illinois	California (4)	Thomas Yin	Chicago, Illinois	
2003	Adam Hesterberg, Washington	California (5)	Pallavi Shah	Chicago, Illinois	
2004	Gregory Gauthier, Illinois	Illinois	Steve Ondes	Washington, D.C.	
2005	Neal Wu, Louisiana	Texas (1)	Jeff Boyd	Detroit, Michigan	
2006	Daesun Yim, New Jersey	Virginia (3)	Barbara Burnett	Arlington, Virginia	
2007	Kevin Chen, Texas	Texas (2)	Jeff Boyd	Fort Worth, Texas	
2008	Darryl Wu, Washington	Texas (3)	Jeff Boyd	Denver, Colorado	
2009	Bobby Shen, Texas	Texas (4)	Jeff Boyd	Orlando, Florida	
2010	Mark Sellke, Indiana	California (6)	Donna Phair	Orlando, Florida	
2011	Scott Wu, Louisiana	California (7)	Vandana Kadam	Washington, D.C.	
2012	Chad Qian, Indiana	Massachusetts (3)	Josh Frost	Orlando, Florida	
2013	Alec Sun, Massachusetts	Massachusetts (4)	Josh Frost	Washington, D.C.	
2014	Swapnil Garg, California	California (8)	David Vaughn	Orlando, Florida	
2015	Kevin Liu, Indiana	Indiana (2)	Trent Tormoehlen	Boston, Massachusetts	
2016	Edward Wan, Washington	Texas (5)	Isil Nal	Washington, D.C.	
2017	Luke Robitaille, Texas	Texas (6)	Isil Nal	Orlando, Florida	
2018	Luke Robitaille, Texas	Texas (7)	Isil Nal	Washington, D.C.	
2019	Daniel Mai, Massachusetts	Massachusetts (5)	Josh Frost	Orlando, Florida	
2020	No national competition held due to COVID-19 pandemic				
2021	Marvin Mao, New Jersey	New Jersey (1)	Stephanie Cucinella	Online	
2022	Allan Yuan, Alabama	New Jersey (2)	Marybeth Gakos	Washington, D.C.	
2023	Channing Yang, Texas	Texas (8)	Andrea Smith	Orlando, Florida	
2024	Benjamin Jiang, Florida	Texas (9)	Hui Quan	Washington, D.C.	
2025	Nathan Liu, Texas	Massachusetts (6)	Josh Frost	Washington, D.C.	
2026	Justin Kim, California	Massachusetts (7)	Josh Frost	Orlando, Florida	

== See also ==
- American Mathematics Competitions
- List of mathematics competitions
