= Selenne Bañuelos =

American mathematician

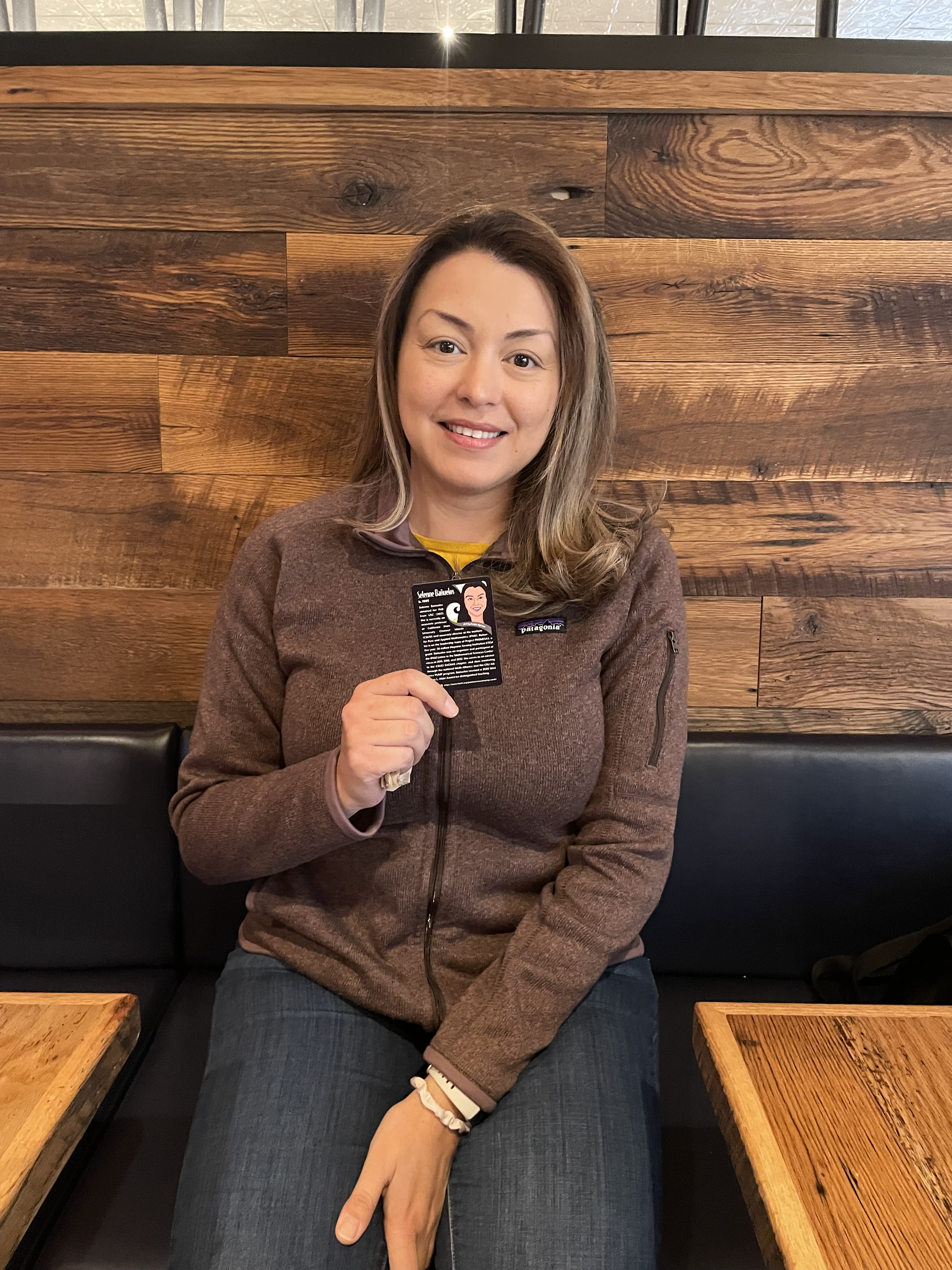
- Selenne Bañuelos holding the EvenQuads card that features her, Jan 2023.
- Born: January 29, 1985 (age 41); Los Angeles, California
- Education: University of California, Santa Barbara; University of Southern California
- Awards: Mathematical Association of America Henry L. Alder Award (2020)
- Scientific career
- Fields: Mathematician
- Workplaces: California State University Channel Islands
- Thesis: Structured two-stage population model with migration between multiple locations in a periodic environment (2013)
- Doctoral advisor: Robert John Sacker

Selenne Bañuelos (born January 29, 1985) is an American mathematician and associate professor of mathematics at California State University Channel Islands. Her research is in the areas of differential and difference equations and dynamical systems, with a focus on their applications to mathematical biology.

== Early life, education, and career ==
Bañuelos was born Selenne Hayde Torres-Garcia to Georgina Torres, Mexican immigrants who raised her in the community of Boyle Heights, east of downtown Los Angeles. earned her B.S. degree in mathematics from the University of California, Santa Barbara in 2007. She was awarded a Ph.D. in applied mathematics from the University of Southern California (USC) in 2013. Her dissertation Structured two-stage population model with migration between multiple locations in a periodic environment was supervised by Robert John Sacker. During her doctoral studies at USC, she was presented with the Department of Mathematics Denis Ray Estes Graduate Teaching Prize. She was a co-founder of the USC chapter of SACNAS. Bañuelos was part of the SACNAS Chapter Leadership Institute Alumni for her work at USC.

Bañuelos joined the faculty at California State University Channel Islands in 2014 as an assistant professor of mathematics. She is currently an associate professor of mathematics. She is co-advisor to the SACNAS chapter at Channel Islands, a mentor for Math Alliance, and a mentor and advisor for the CSU Alliance PUMP (Preparing Undergraduates through Mentoring towards PhDs) Program.

In 2014, Bañuelos was a Linton Poodry SACNAS Leadership Institute fellow and in 2015, she was a Project NExT, New Experiences in Teaching, fellow.

In 2018, Bañuelos was featured on the Lathisms calendar. In 2020, she received the Mathematical Association of America Henry L. Alder Award for Distinguished Teaching. She is included in deck 2 of EvenQuads which is a series of playing card decks that feature notable women mathematicians published by the Association of Women in Mathematics.
