= Richard Rusczyk =

American mathematician and founder of Art of Problem Solving

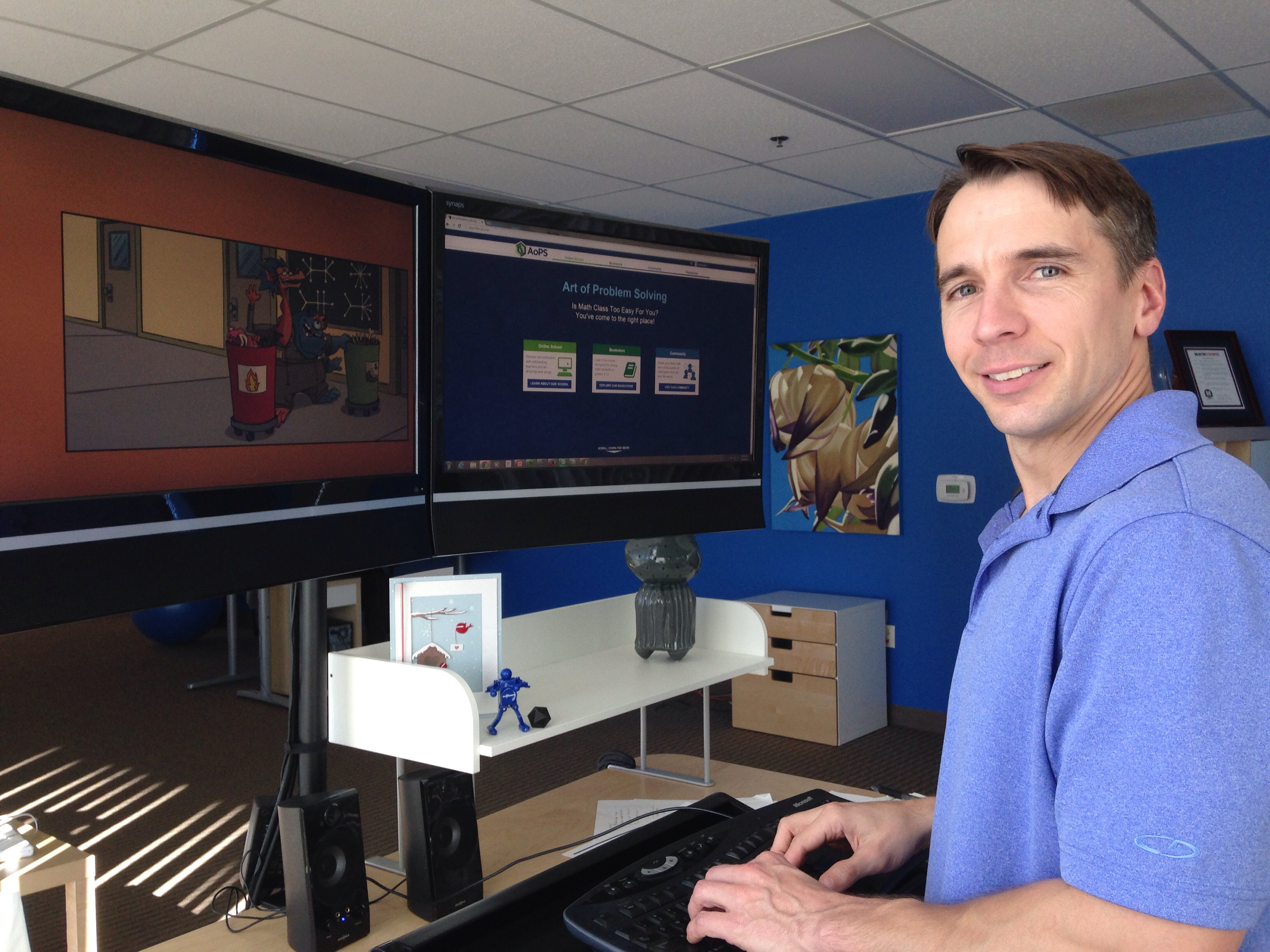
- Rusczyk in 2015
- Born: September 21, 1971 (age 55); Idaho Falls, Idaho, U.S.
- Education: Princeton University (BS)
- Known for: Founder of Art of Problem Solving
- Spouse: Vanessa Rusczyk (m. 1993)
- Awards: World Federation of National Mathematics Competitions Paul Erdös Award (2014)
- Website: artofproblemsolving.com

Richard Rusczyk (/ˈrʌsɪk/; born September 21, 1971) is an American entrepreneur. He was the founder and CEO of Art of Problem Solving Inc. and a co-author of the Art of Problem Solving textbooks.

Rusczyk was a national Mathcounts participant in 1985, and he won the USA Math Olympiad (USAMO) in 1989. He is one of the co-creators of the Mandelbrot Competition, and a former director of the USA Mathematical Talent Search (USAMTS). He also founded the San Diego Math Circle.

== Early life and education ==
Richard Rusczyk was born in Idaho Falls, Idaho in 1971.

He signed up for the Mathcounts program when he was in middle school.

As a high schooler, Rusczyk was a part of his high school math team and took part in the American Mathematics Competitions. Rusczyk would later go on to win the USA Math Olympiad (USAMO) and qualify as an alternate for the USA team for the International Math Olympiad (IMO).

Rusczyk attended Princeton University, graduating in 1993 with a bachelor's degree in chemical engineering.

After graduating from college, Rusczyk went to work as a bond trader at D. E. Shaw & Co. for 4 years.

He then left to pursue his passion of becoming a high school teacher.

== Art of Problem Solving ==
Art of Problem Solving (AoPS) is an educational organization founded in 2003 by Rusczyk. It provides textbooks, online courses, and community resources designed to help middle and high school students strengthen their mathematics and problem-solving skills, particularly in preparation for mathematics competitions.

=== History ===
Between 1993 and 1994, Richard Rusczyk and Sandor Lehoczky authored the first two volumes of the Art of Problem Solving series. These books were designed to prepare students for mathematical competitions by teaching concepts and problem-solving techniques not typical in standard school curricula. The series later gave its name to the educational company Rusczyk founded in 2003.

Rusczyk later founded Art of Problem Solving in 2003, launching an online platform that offers instructional courses, discussion forums, a collaborative wiki, and interactive games such as For the Win (FTW) and Reaper and "Alcumus".

=== Initiatives ===
In 2004, Rusczyk founded the nonprofit Art of Problem Solving Initiative, which initially administered the USAMTS. It now supports local mathematics programs across the United States.

In 2012, Rusczyk received the Mathcounts Distinguished Alumnus Award. In 2014, he was awarded the Paul Erdős Award by the World Federation of National Mathematics Competitions.

=== Leadership ===
On March 24, 2025, Rusczyk retired as chief executive officer of Art of Problem Solving. He was succeeded by Ben Kornell as CEO, with Andrew Sutherland appointed as chief product officer. However, as of February 9, 2026, Rusczyk is returning as CEO to guide new initiatives. He continues to serve on the company's board of directors.

=== Textbooks ===
Richard Rusczyk has authored and co-authored several mathematics textbooks for students in grades 5–12, including Prealgebra, Introduction to Algebra, and Introduction to Geometry.

After his first year at Princeton University, Rusczyk collaborated with Sandor Lehoczky and Sam Vandervelde to create the Mandelbrot Competition. Following the competition's limited success, Rusczyk and Lehoczky began writing the first volumes of the Art of Problem Solving series.

==== Full list of (co)authored textbooks in published order ====
- The Art of Problem Solving, Volume 1: The Basics (1993), co-authored with Sandor Lehoczky
- The Art of Problem Solving, Volume 2: And Beyond (1994), co-authored with Sandor Lehoczky
- Introduction to Geometry (2006)
- Introduction to Algebra (2007)
- Intermediate Algebra (2007), co-authored with Mathew Crawford
- Precalculus (2009)
- Prealgebra (2011), co-authored with David Patrick and Ravi Boppana

== Personal life ==
Circa 1993, Rusczyk married Vanessa, also a 1993 Princeton graduate. The two collaborate closely on running AoPS.

== See also ==
- Mandelbrot Competition
- United States of America Mathematical Talent Search (USAMTS)
- Mathcounts

== Categories ==
- Mathematics education in the United States
- Educational websites
- American educational companies
