= Mary Beisiegel =

American mathematician

- Education: University of Alberta
- Scientific career
- Fields: Mathematics
- Thesis: Being (Almost) a Mathematician: Teacher Identity Formation in Post-Secondary Mathematics (2009)

Mary D. Beisiegel is a Professor in the Department of Mathematics at Oregon State University. She is a Whiteley Faculty scholar for Teaching Excellence. Her research is in mathematics education.

== Education and career ==
Beisiegel received her PhD in Mathematics from the University of Alberta in 2009. Her dissertation, Being (Almost) a Mathematician: Teacher Identity Formation in Post-Secondary Mathematics, was supervised by Elaine Simmt, David Pimm, and Terrance Ronald Carson.

== Awards and honors ==
Beisiegel received the Mathematical Association of America's Henry L. Adler Award in 2017.
