= Ulrike Beisiegel =

German biochemist and molecular biologist

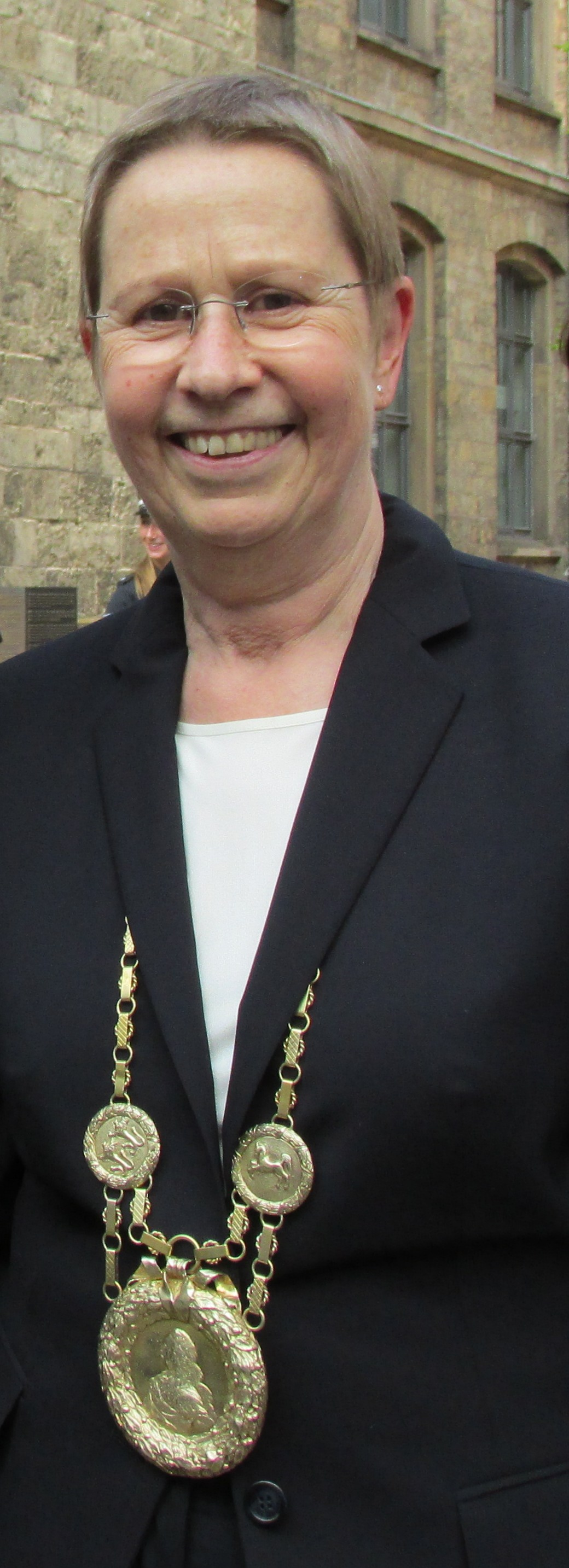
- Born: 23 December 1952 (age 73); Mülheim an der Ruhr, North Rhine-Westphalia, West Germany
- Known for: first woman president of the University of Göttingen
- Awards: Heinz Maier-Leibnitz Prize; Rudolf Schönheimer Medal

Academic background
- Education: University of Marburg
- Influences: Joseph L. Goldstein; Michael S. Brown; Gunüla O Uvecrona

Ulrike Beisiegel (born 23 December 1952) is a German biochemist and university professor who in 2011 became the first woman to serve as president of the University of Göttingen, founded in 1737. Her research on liver fats and disease was honored with the Heinz Maier-Leibnitz Prize, the Rudolf Schönheimer Medal and an honorary doctorate. Intent on maintaining high levels of scholarship and diminishing scientific misconduct, she has served on many boards and committees, receiving the Ubbo-Emmius Medal for her commitment to good scientific practice and an honorary doctorate from the University of Edinburgh.

== Biography ==
Ulrike Beisiegel was born on 23 December 1952 in Mülheim an der Ruhr, North Rhine-Westphalia, Germany. Her undergraduate studies in biology were completed in Münster and Marburg, where in 1979, she attained a PhD from the Department of Medicine in Human Biology at the University of Marburg. Afterward, she moved to Dallas, Texas, where she conducted postdoctoral research under the Nobel Prize winners Joseph L. Goldstein and Michael S. Brown in the Department of Molecular Genetics at the University of Texas at Dallas. Upon her return to the University of Marburg, Beisiegel worked as a research assistant for two years and was awarded the Heinz Maier-Leibnitz Prize in 1983 for her work on "receptor defects as a cause of disease". Beisiegel served as an academic counselor at the University Medical Center of Hamburg beginning in 1984.

In 1989, Beisiegel began a collaboration with the Swedish scientist Gunüla O. Uvecrona of Umeå University on dietary fats in the blood and their effect on the liver. The research looked at triglycerides and enzymes in the fat particle deposits of the liver, as a means of preventing cardiovascular disease. She qualified in 1990 as a professor at the University of Hamburg and was promoted to a level C-3 professor in 1996. In 1996, Umeå University awarded her an honorary doctorate for her collaboration with Uvecrona. Five years later, Beisiegel qualified as a level C-4 professor and became director of the Institute of Biochemistry and Molecular Biology at the University Medical Center Hamburg-Eppendorf.

In addition to her teaching, Beisiegel has served on numerous standards boards. In 2000, she was elected to serve as a review board member for the German Research Foundation and in 2002 was elected as a member of the Leibniz Association's Senate Evaluation committee. In 2006 she became a member of the German Council of Science and Humanities (GCSH) and was elected as chair of the GCSH research commission in 2008. In 2005, Beisiegel was appointed speaker of the Ombudsman panel of the German Research Foundation with the duties of establishing rules for good scientific practices and monitoring scientific misconduct. Beisiegel was awarded the Rudolf Schönheimer Medal in 2008 from the German Society for Arteriosclerosis Research. The medal is the highest award for achievement in the field of atherosclerosis research. In 2009 she became a Senator of the Leibniz Association and in 2010 was confirmed as the first woman president of the University of Göttingen with a six-year term from 1 January 2011. She became a Senator of the Max Planck Society in 2011, Vice President of the German Rectors' Conference in 2012 and in 2014 both her research on cardiovascular diseases and her commitment to good science practice was recognized with the award of the Ubbo-Emmius Medal. In 2015, Beisiegel was awarded an honorary doctorate from the University of Edinburgh for her contributions to university management and promotion of interdisciplinary and international collaboration aimed at improving the academic community.

== Bibliography ==
- Henningsen, Bernd; Schlaeger, Jürgen; Tenorth, Heinz-Elmar (2013). Humboldt's Model: The Future of the Universities in the World of Research : Conference Report. Berlin, Germany: BWV Verlag. ISBN 978-3-8305-3208-8.
