= California State University Channel Islands =

Public university near Camarillo, California, U.S.

- Type: Public university
- Established: 2002; 24 years ago
- Parent institution: California State University
- Accreditation: WSCUC
- Endowment: $35.1 million (2024)
- Budget: $209.8 million (2023-24)
- President: Susan Andrzejewski (interim)
- Faculty: 413 (fall 2024)
- Administrative staff: 557 (fall 2024)
- Students: 4,880 (fall 2024)
- Undergraduates: 4,673 (fall 2024)
- Postgraduates: 207 (fall 2024)
- Location: Near Camarillo, California, United States; 34.16205°N 119.043572°W
- Campus: 1,187 acres (480 ha); Midsize suburb
- Newspaper: The CI View
- Colors: Red and silver
- Nickname: Dolphins
- Mascot: Ekho the Dolphin
- Website: www.csuci.edu

California State University Channel Islands (CSUCI, CSU Channel Islands) is a public university in Ventura County, California. Located near the city of Camarillo, it opened in 2002 as the 23rd campus in the California State University system. CSUCI is located on the Central Coast of California, at the intersection of the Oxnard Plain and northernmost edge of the Santa Monica Mountains range. The Channel Islands are nearby where the university operates a scientific research station on Santa Rosa Island.

The university is a Hispanic-serving institution. Channel Islands offers 63 bachelor's degree programs, 12 master's degree programs, and 4 teaching credentials. In the fall of 2020, the university enrolled 6,943 undergraduate and postgraduate students. In the fall of 2020, the university had 425 faculty, of whom 153 (or 36%) were on the tenure track.

== History ==
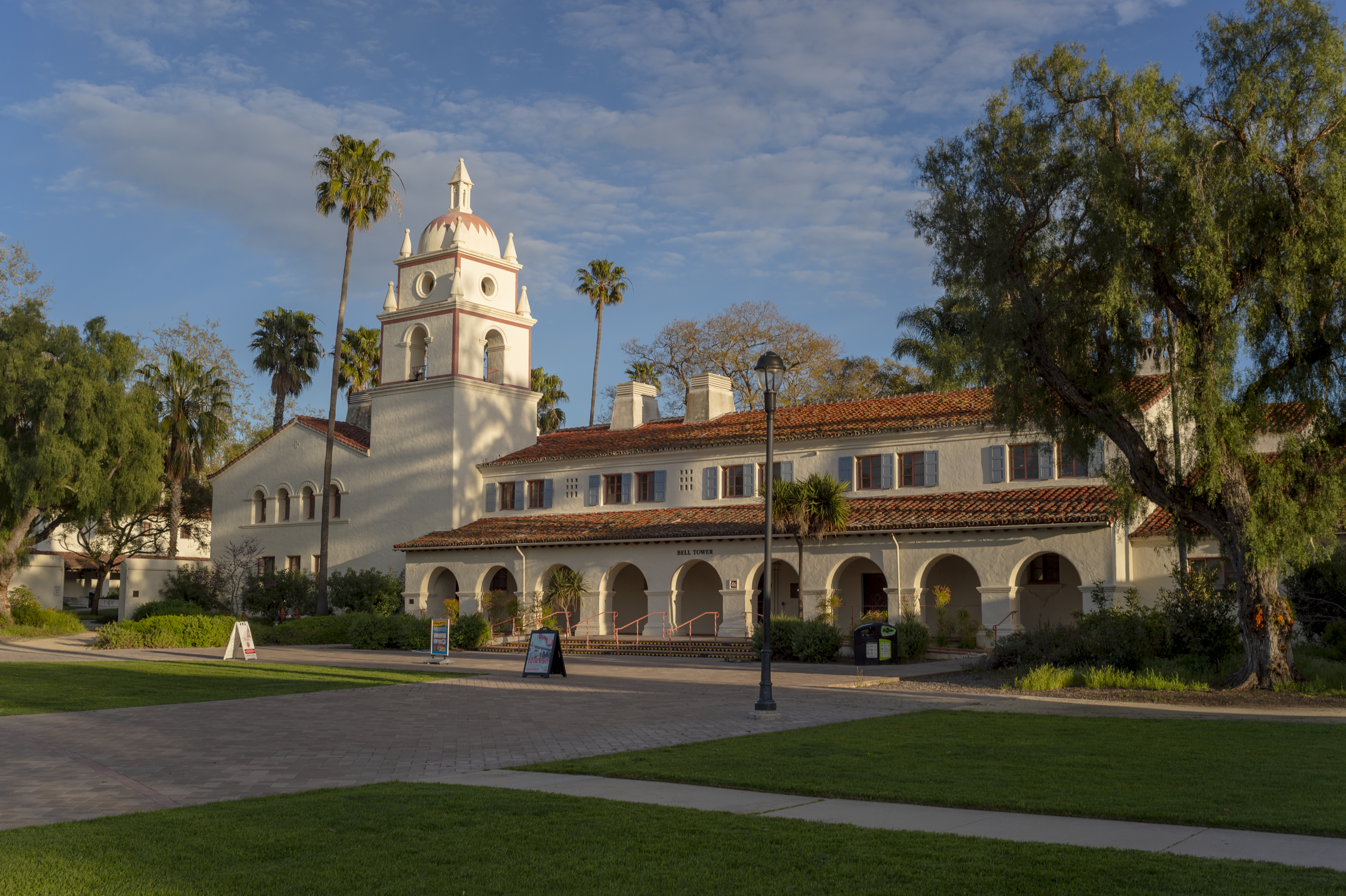
Camarillo State Mental Hospital, built in a Mission Revival style in 1937, was redeveloped in 2002 to serve as the campus for CSUCI

The first buildings of the campus were built in 1934 as part of President Franklin D. Roosevelt's New Deal during the Great Depression, a public works project to house the Camarillo State Mental Hospital and provide work for the unemployed. Construction teams utilized several thousand laborers over the course of three years in their endeavor to create everything from the hospital itself to a power plant, local utilities, and animal husbandry/farm facilities that would eventually support a complex of patients and staff numbering into the thousands during normal weekday operations. The hospital operated between 1936 and 1997.

Planning for the University began in 1965, when State Senator Robert J. Lagomarsino co-authored Senate Bill 288 calling for establishment of a four-year public college in Ventura County, and Governor Pat Brown signed a bill authorizing a study for a state college for the county. In 1974, Joyce Kennedy established the UC/CSU Ventura Learning Center in Ventura as a partnership between UC Santa Barbara and California State University, Northridge. She went on to serve as director of the CSUN Ventura Campus for more than 15 years. The Ventura Learning Center became the CSUN Ventura Campus in 1988.

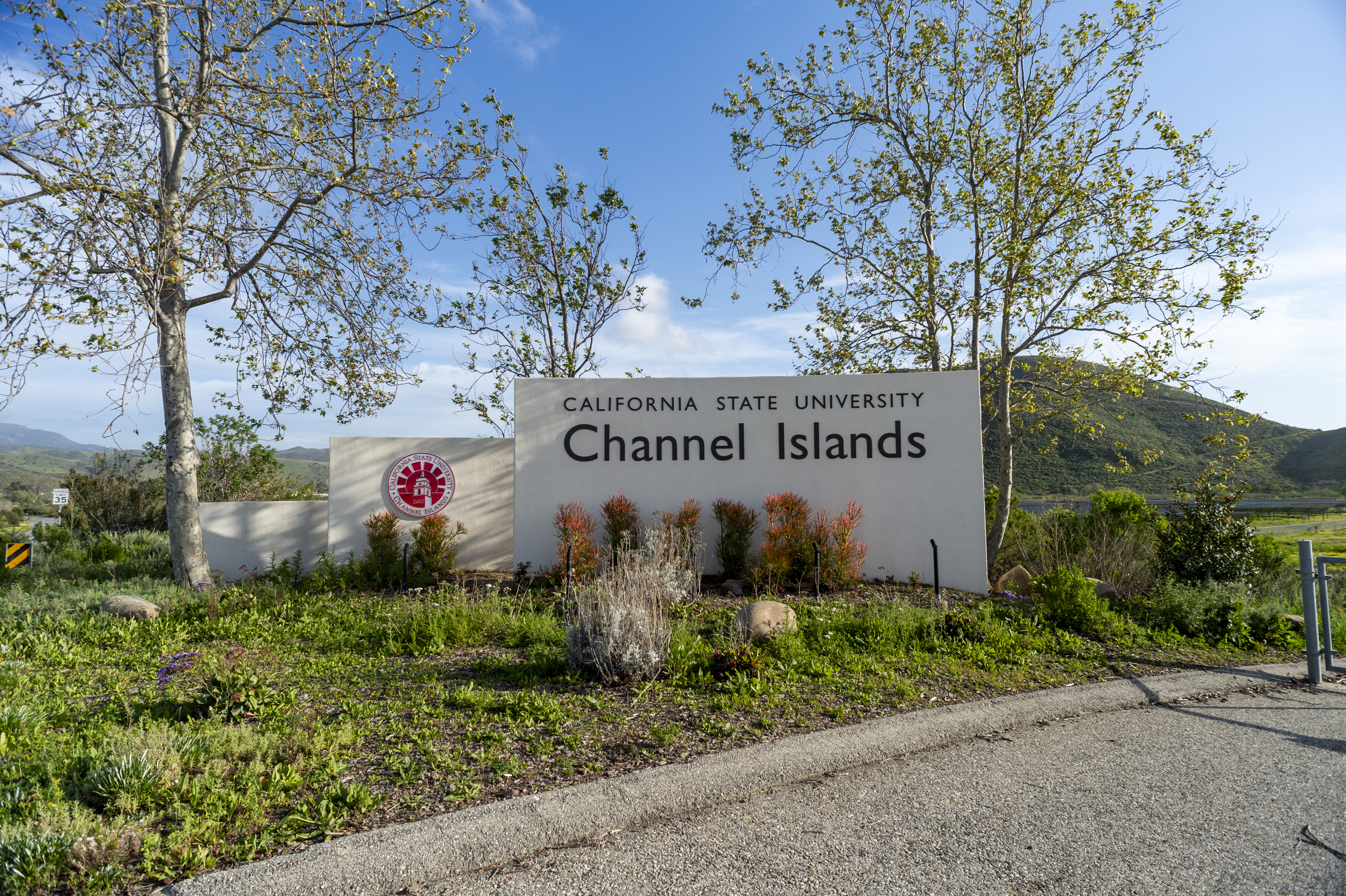
CSU Channel Islands Entrance Sign

In 1996, J. Handel Evans began as planning president charged with beginning development of a public, four-year university in the region. In September 1997, on the recommendation of the chancellor and a community task force appointed by the Governor, CSU's board of trustees voted unanimously to accept the former Camarillo State Hospital site for the purpose of transforming it into the CSU's 23rd campus. In July 1996, CSU's board of trustees formally adopted the name California State University Channel Islands for the new university. In September 1997, Governor Wilson signed into law S.B. 623 (Jack O'Connell) providing for the financing and support of the transition of the site for use as a university campus. The state legislature and CSU's board of trustees provided funds to begin the conversion of the facility from a state hospital into a college campus. In 1997, the hospital closed and the patients were moved into the state-local system. In August 1999, the Ventura Learning Center moved as tenants to the Camarillo site as CSUN-CI, a satellite facility for CSU Northridge.

CSU's board of trustees appointed Richard R. Rush the founding president of California State University Channel Islands. He started working on June 18, 2001; however, Rush's formal inauguration wasn't held until April 19, 2002. On August 16, 2002, CSUCI opened to upper division transfer students and in the fall of 2003 it accepted its first freshman class. As of January 2006, the first named school of the campus was the Martin V. Smith School of Business & Economics. On May 17, 2007, CSUCI graduated its inaugural freshman class and received its initial accreditation for seven years, the maximum period allowed by the WASC. The campus is under continuing construction to accommodate the projected growth of the university. While there were about 7,000 registered students in 2010, projected enrollment for the year 2025 is 15,000 full-time students. Rush retired in August 2016, after 15 years as the campus's second president. He was succeeded by Erika D. Beck who previously served as Provost and Executive Vice President of Nevada State College. In November 2020, the CSU Chancellor named Erika D. Beck president of California State University Northridge (CSUN). She departed CSUCI in January 2021 and CSUCI Vice President for Student Affairs Richard Yao was appointed interim president of the university. In January 2022, Richard Yao was named the fourth permanent president of CSUCI.

=== Hispanic Serving Institution ===
CSUCI is the only four-year public university in Ventura County and in 2010 it received Hispanic Serving Institution status (HSI). The university achieved this status by moving past the threshold of having at least a 25 percent Hispanic student population. Achieving HSI status has enabled the school to compete for funding and other financial support from the U.S. Department of Education. CSUCI received approximately $16.4 million of federal support for HSI Initiatives. The Hispanic/Latino student population is 50% as of the fall of 2017.

== Campus ==
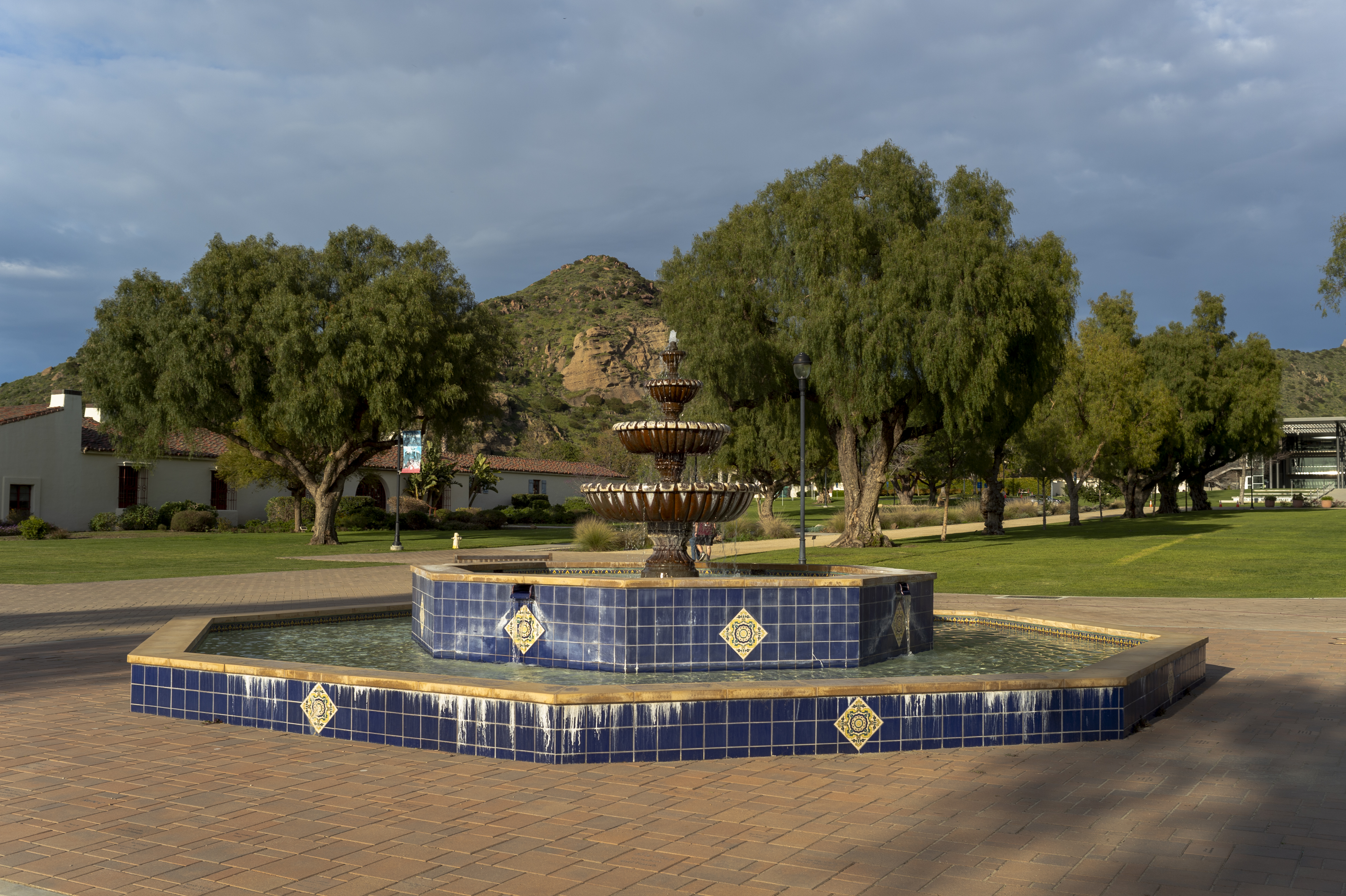
Central Mall Fountain

The campus is located about two miles (3.2 km) south of the city of Camarillo, at the base of Long Grade Canyon. The school is set on rich agricultural land at the edge of the Oxnard Plain bordered by farms and nestled into the base of the Santa Monica Mountains. The flat site is marked by a lone peak called Round Mountain (the Chumash name is Sathwiwa). The state hospital was built in a remote area so roads were improved to provide for the campus traffic. The university developed a bus transit network to serve the campus with VISTA buses providing access to Gold Coast Transit in Oxnard and the Camarillo train station. Gaining official possession of the land in 1998 and then improvements began in 1999, on the 634-acre (257 ha) existing campus-style facility, primarily one to two-story buildings organized around three primary quads. In 2007, the campus acquired an additional 153 acres (62 ha). Many of the buildings are in the Mission Revival and Spanish Colonial Revival architectural styles, although there are a few "modern" buildings. The campus is split into two primary sections: North Quad and South Quad. In 2012, Del Norte and Madera halls were opened in the North Quad; some of the buildings in the North Quad are still uninhabited and unsafe due to age, which became CSU Channel Islands University Park located adjacent to the campus.

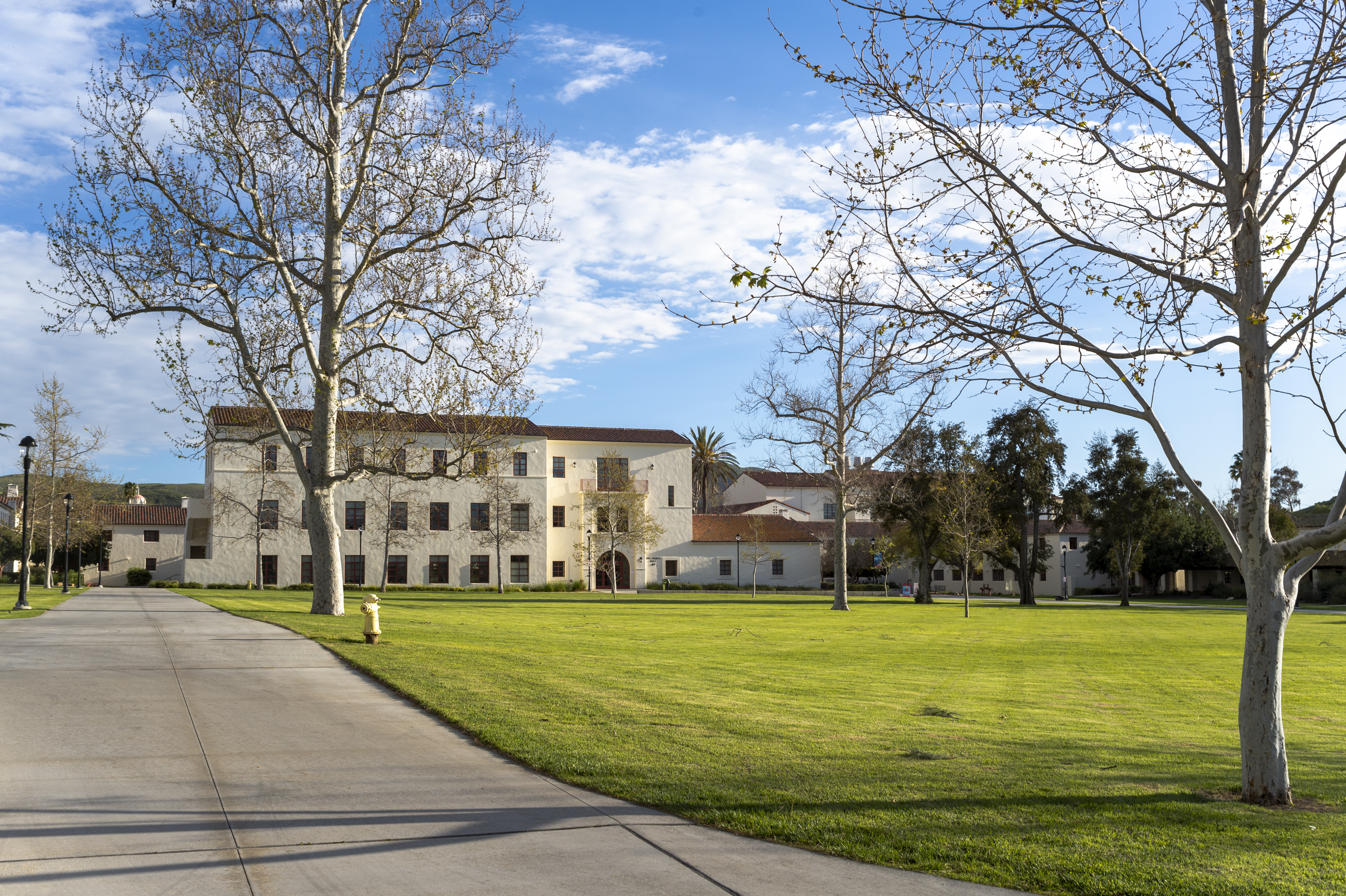
Photo of Del Norte Hall in the North Quad

=== North Quad ===
Development on the North Quad includes the 2012 Del Norte classroom building and Madera Hall, which primarily houses faculty. Solano Hall and the Grand and Petit salons received additional renovations in 2012 and 2019, and house offices, classrooms, and a conference center. Manzanita Hall includes classrooms for the nursing program and other various classes. Placer Hall is home to the University's Public Safety department and located next to the Business School. Napa Hall, which includes the Mike Curb Studios opened in 2010, has classrooms for art and design students. University Hall houses the President's Office, along with various other administrative units.

==== Martin V. Smith Center for Integrative Decision-Making ====
Martin V. ("Bud") Smith donated $8 million to finance the construction of the Martin V. Smith Center for IDM and the first college on campus named in his honor. Additionally, his name marks The Martin V. Smith School of Business & Economics, the Martin V. Smith Professorship in Land Use Studies, and the Martin V. Smith Center for Integrative Decision Making. The 4,157-square-foot (386.2 m^{2}) building opened in the spring of 2009. It features a large lecture hall and adjoining classrooms. This building is one of the few classrooms in the North Quad.

=== South Quad ===
Most of the campus's redeveloped buildings are located within the South Quad area. The Bell Tower houses most of the campus classrooms and professor offices. The Bell Tower can be seen from most areas on campus because of its height and centrality.

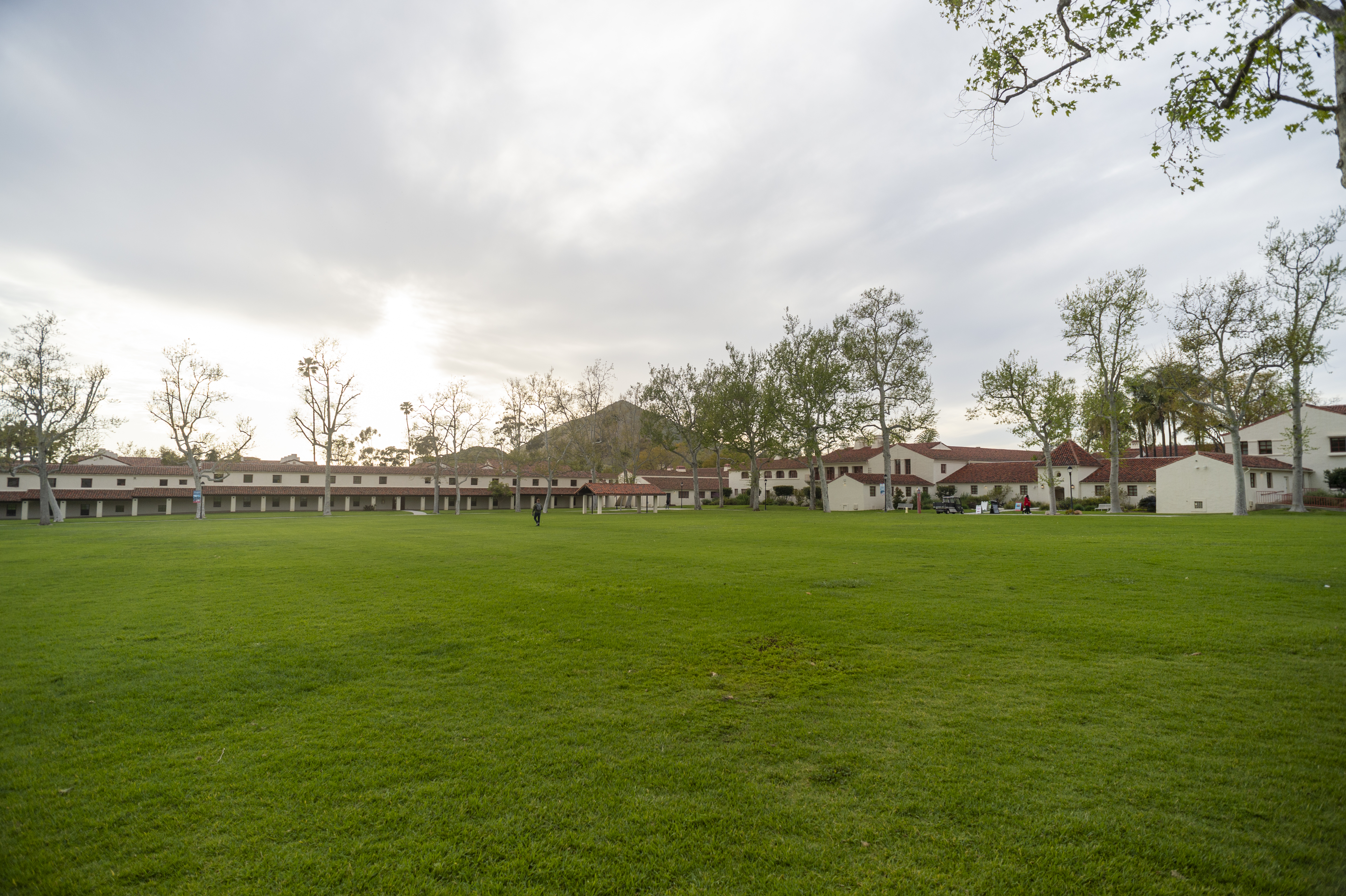
The school's South Quad is differentiated from the North Quad by the presence of student housing, seen on the left of the image

In 2006, CSUCI students passed a referendum to fund the design, construction, and operation of the new Student Union. The 23,000-square-foot (2,100 m^{2}) Student Union includes a large programmable area for student events and live entertainment; a dining center with a coffee shop, pizzeria, sandwich deli and salad bar; lounges for informal gatherings; a game room, pool tables and computer gaming systems; and ASI offices for Student Government, Student Programming Board, The Nautical Yearbook, and the Channel Islands View (CI View) student newspaper. The Student Union also includes a courtyard for outdoor events and gatherings for the entire campus community.

=== John Spoor Broome Library ===
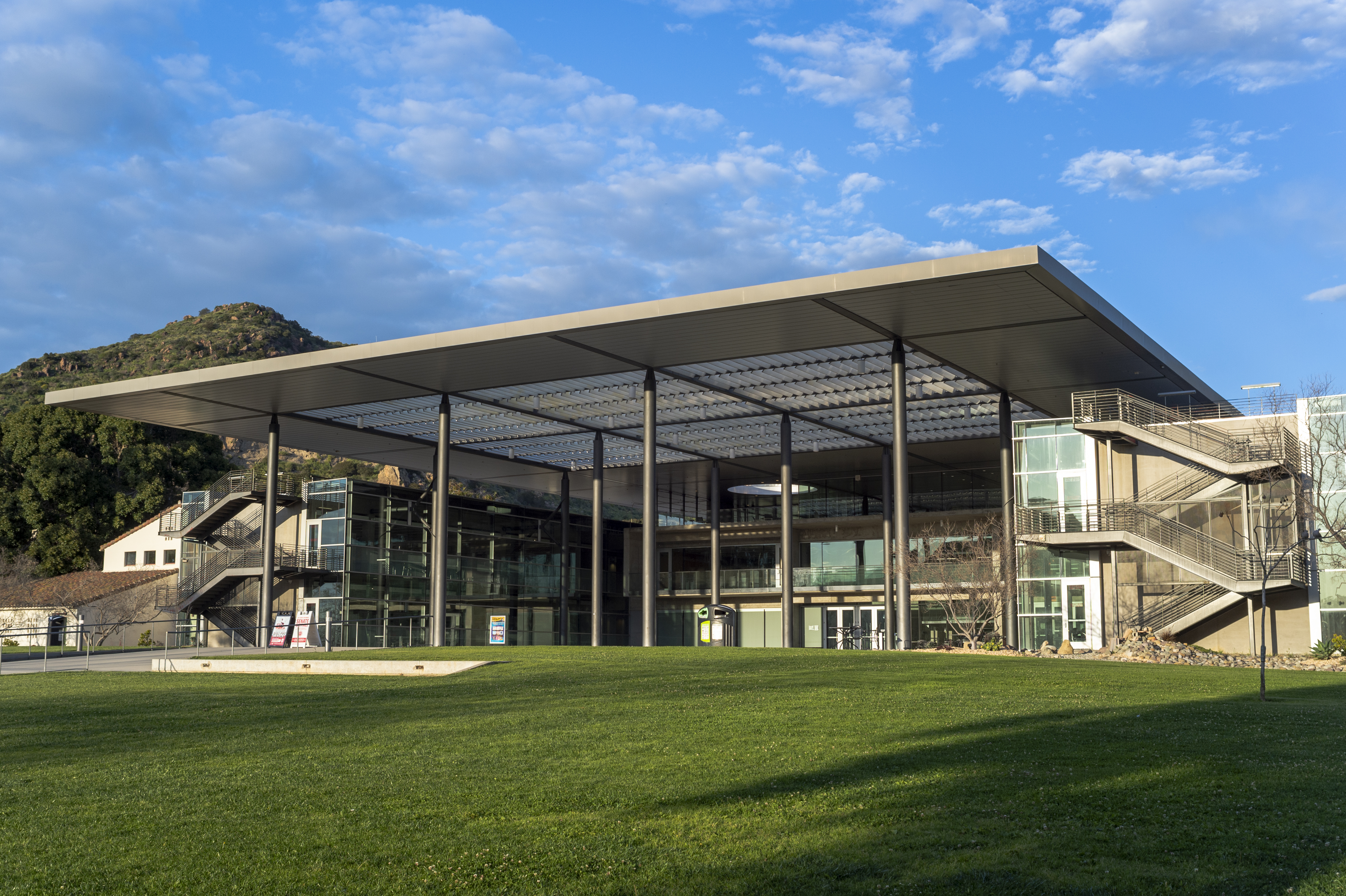
John Spoor Broome Library

The John Spoor Broome Library was designed by architect Lord Norman Foster and named after the first major donor to campus, John "Jack" Spoor Broome, an Oxnard rancher and philanthropist. The library opened on April 4, 2008. It is one of the few buildings on the campus that does not represent the Spanish mission style. This 137,000-square-foot (12,700 m^{2}) complex, which is twelve times larger than the previous library, is home to 75,000 books, 180,000 electronic books, and 32,000 images of art. It also complements the campus sustainability plan by using recyclable carpeting, natural lighting and combining the new structure with the existing buildings surrounding it.

In the summer of 2002, former Congressman Robert J. Lagomarsino and his wife, Norma, established the Robert J. and Norma M. Lagomarsino Department of Archives and Special Collections, which is housed within the library. Lagomarsino, a native of Ventura County, served as mayor of Ojai in 1958, as a state senator from 1961 to 1974, and as a United States congressman from 1974 to 1992.

== Academics ==
CI offers undergraduate majors in twenty-two areas of study. Additionally, CI planned to add majors in geography, kinesiology and social justice by fall 2014 and nutrition and philosophy by fall 2015. The school welcomed its first engineering majors when it launched its mechatronics program in the fall of 2018. Popular majors for undergraduates in 2018 included Psychology (General) at 19.25%, Business Administration (Management and Operations) at 13.98%, and Sociology at 7.85%. While popular majors for graduates were Business Administration (Management and Operations) at 37.86%, Education (General) at 26.21% and Biotechnology at 17.48%. CSUCI offers a Combined-degree programs in MS Biotechnology/MBA as of 2020.

The school also has various Academic Centers and Institutes. Four out of its five centers are mission specific centers and has two institutes, the Alzheimer's Institute and the Small Business Institute. All centers and institutes must support the CI mission. Mission specific centers are developed with the primary purpose of enabling the CI faculty to support the mission of the university. Centers cut across disciplines and have co-curricular implications. Institutes and other centers are created with the intent to provide a necessary service, program, or disciplinary or interdisciplinary focus for the university and/or community.

=== Rankings ===
Academic rankings

Master's
- Washington Monthly: 87

Regional
- U.S. News & World Report: 23

National
- Forbes: 378

2024-2025 USNWR Regional Colleges West Rankings
Top Performers on Social Mobility	7
Top Public Schools	13 (tie)
Top Nursing	214

The 2022–2023 U.S. News & World Report Best Regional Colleges West Rankings ranked Channel Islands 11 on Top Performers on Social Mobility, 12 on Top Public Schools (tie) and 293 in Nursing (tie). In 2022, Money Magazine ranked Channel Islands 4 on Best College for Transfer Students, and College Magazine rank Channel Islands 6 on Top Colleges for Surfers.

=== Statistics ===
Undergraduate admission statistics
	Fall 2025	Fall 2024	Fall 2023	Fall 2022	Fall 2021
First-time Freshmen
Applicants	8,700	8,816	10,089	10,432	9,244
Admits	8,150	8,353	9,382	9,342	8,597
Admit rate	94%	95%	93%	90%	93%
Enrolled	554	520	568	635	566
Yield rate	7%	6%	6%	7%	7%
Transfers
Applicants	4,693	4,650	4,715	4,795	5,774
Admits	3,722	3,690	3,718	3,881	4,832
Admit rate	79%	79%	79%	81%	84%
Enrolled	1,083	987	945	914	1,102
Yield rate	29%	27%	25%	24%	23%

- Admission rate: 78%
- Average high school GPA of first-time freshmen: 3.22
- Average ACT Score: 21
- Average SAT Score: 1070
- Average class size: 20.1 students
- Four year graduation rate: 26%
- Six year graduation rate: 69%
- Transferred out: 56.15%

== Student life ==
Throughout the year students can participate in intramural sports, health and fitness activities; join various student organizations; utilize waterfront programs (sailing, paddle boarding and kayaking); and participate in outdoor adventures (Group camping trips to the Channel Islands and day hikes), honor societies, leadership retreats and workshops, multicultural programs, sports clubs, block parties, and career and graduate fairs.

Undergraduate demographics as of Fall 2023
Race and ethnicity	Total
Hispanic	60%
White	23%
Asian	7%
Two or more races	4%
Unknown	3%
Black	2%
Foreign national	1%
Economic diversity
Low-income (Note: The percentage of students who received an income-based federal Pell grant intended for low-income students.)	48%
Affluent (Note: The percentage of students who are a part of the American middle class or wealthier.)	52%

=== Student demographics ===
The student population is diverse, in 2020 with 55% of students identifying as Hispanic/Latina/o American, 25% identifying as White American, 6% as Asian American, 2% African American, 4.5% as mixed-race and 3.5% unknown. The student population is 64% percent female and 36% percent male in 2017.

=== Channel Islands Boating Center (CIBC) ===
Located at the Channel Islands harbor, the Channel Islands Boating Center (CIBC) is a facility that provides free educational and recreational opportunities to current students of CSUCI. The CIBC is also available to community residents for a small fee. The waterfront program through the CIBC offers various instructional and safety classes in kayaking, sunset kayaking, sailing and stand up paddle boarding. They also take clubs and organizations out for group adventures. Beach clean-ups have also been added to the schedule.

=== Outdoor Adventures ===
The Outdoor Adventure (OA) program provides students with experiences that promote personal growth, experiential learning, social responsibility, and environmental stewardship to the CI community. They offer adventure trips off campus, day hikes, waterfront activities in sailing, kayaking, standup paddle boarding and team activities.

=== Housing ===
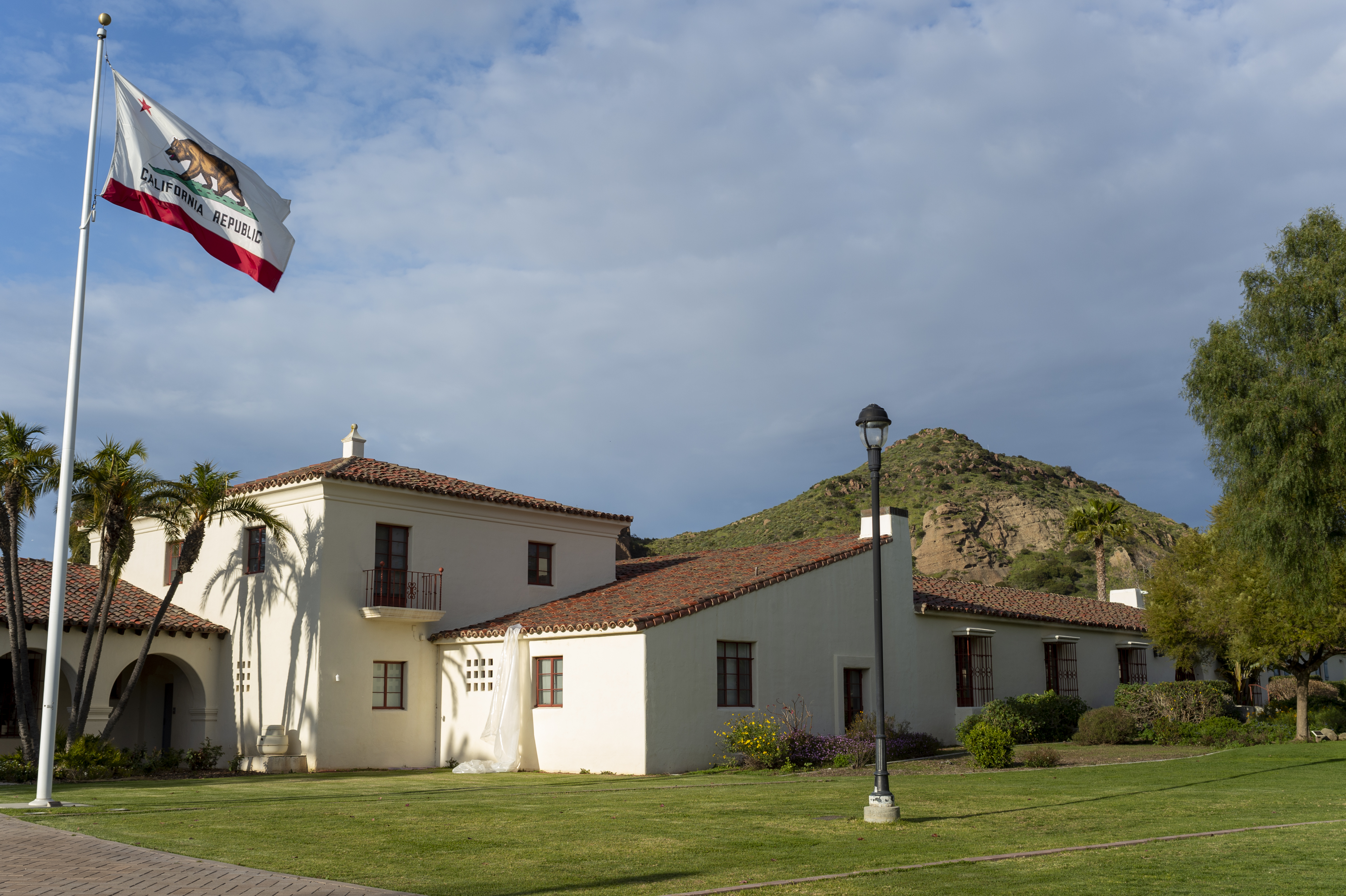
Richard R. Rush Hall

Three villages make up student housing. They are named after three of the Channel Islands: Santa Cruz, Anacapa, and Santa Rosa.

Opened in the fall of 2007, Santa Cruz Village is home to sophomore students and students who have completed fewer than thirty units. Most suites are two-bedroom, housing six students with three in each bedroom. Most single occupancy rooms are reserved for the Resident Assistants or "RAs," students employed by Housing and Residential Education. Santa Cruz Village has various amenities including a game room, a fitness room, a dance studio, television rooms, and study rooms. At capacity, Santa Cruz Village is home to 460 residents. Anacapa Village houses transfer students and junior-level students. Each dorm has a small kitchen and living area, two bathrooms, and four bedrooms housing six roommates in a two-double, two-single format.

=== University Glen Corporation ===
The University Glen Community contains 658 apartments (available for rent only), town homes and single-family residences (available for rental or purchase). Sizes range from 1,400 to 2,400 sq ft (130 to 220 m^{2}) and offer more living space than what could be found outside of the university.

The Town Center is a multi-use building with apartments on the two upper floors and 30,000 sq ft (2,800 m^{2}) of retail space on the first floor.

== Athletics ==
Currently there are no teams from the school on the National Collegiate Athletic Association (NCAA) level.

Arroyo Hall, the general student gym on campus, is located between the Bell Tower and Anacapa Village. It has basketball and volleyball courts and various gym equipment. The gym hosts different intramural team tournaments for students and also host all sport teams activities. CSU Channel Islands has various intramural teams and club teams.

- Cycling – This club features a bicycle kitchen (volunteer mechanics/repair advice), riding club and USAC mountain and road racing teams that compete against other colleges and clubs such as USC, UCLA, Stanford, UC Berkeley, and UC Davis.
- Lacrosse – CSUCI men's lacrosse.
- Volleyball – The volleyball team practices in Arroyo Hall.
- Sailing – The sailing team practices in Channel Islands Harbor in Oxnard, California. They compete against teams around California and have had some success.
- Baseball - Men's baseball, established in 2019

== Notable faculty ==
- Sean Anderson, Professor of Environmental Science and Resource Management; conservation biologist
- Cynthia Wyels, Professor of Mathematics
- Selenne Bañuelos, Professor of Mathematics; winner of the 2020 Henry L. Adler Award
