= Mandelbrot Competition =

High school mathematics competition

Named in honor of Benoit Mandelbrot, the Mandelbrot Competition was a mathematics competition founded by Sam Vandervelde, Richard Rusczyk and Sandor Lehoczky that operated from 1990 to 2019. It allowed high school students to compete individually and in four-person teams.

Mandelbrot Competition logo.

== Competition ==
The Mandelbrot was a "correspondence competition," meaning that the competition was sent to a school's coach and students competed at their own school on a predetermined date. Individual results and team answers were then sent back to the contest coordinators. The most notable aspects of the Mandelbrot competition were the difficulty of the problems (much like the American Mathematics Competition and harder American Invitational Mathematics Examination problems) and the proof-based team round. Many past medalists at the International Mathematics Olympiad first tried their skills on the Mandelbrot Competition.

== History ==
The Mandelbrot Competition was started by Sam Vandervelde, Richard Rusczyk, and Sandor Lehoczky while they were undergraduates in the early 1990s. Vandervelde ran the competition until its completion in 2019. Rusczyk now manages Art of Problem Solving Inc. and Lehoczky enjoys a successful career on Wall Street.

== Contest format ==
The individual competition consisted of seven questions of varying value, worth a total of 14 points, that students had 40 minutes to answer. The team competition was a proof-based competition, where many questions were asked about a particular situation, and a team of four students was given 60 minutes to answer.

== Divisions ==
The Mandelbrot Competition had two divisions, referred to as National and Regional. Questions at the National level were more difficult than those at the Regional level, but generally had overlap or concerned similar topics. For example, in the individual competition, the National competition would remove some of the easier Regional questions, and add some harder questions. In the team competition, the topic would be the same but the National level would be given fewer hints.

== Results ==
Results would be published after each annual iteration of the contest, and in its final iteration, the results were published online with School leaderboards and Individual leaderboards divided by region and national. However, since mandelbrot.org is not maintained any more, it can only be visited here.
