= Sean Anderson (scientist) =

American conservation biologist

- Citizenship: United States
- Education: University of California Santa Barbara, University of California Los Angeles, Stanford University
- Scientific career
- Fields: Conservation biology, Restoration ecology
- Workplaces: California State University Channel Islands

Sean Anderson is an American conservation biologist, restoration ecologist and professor of Environmental Science and Resource Management at California State University Channel Islands. He received a BS in ecology and evolution in environmental studies from the University of California Santa Barbara, a PhD in population biology from the University of California Los Angeles and was a postdoctoral fellow at Stanford University. Anderson embraces education and research alike, managing projects from California to Oceania and the Middle East. His lab, named "PIRatE Lab" (an acronym for the Pacific Institute for Restoration Ecology), conducts a wide range of coastal monitoring, ecological restoration, and conservation efforts.

Anderson's projects are often broad in scope and typically grapple with evolving or novel environmental challenges. Examples of his work include: wetland restoration in Turkey and New Orleans, Cook Islands coral reef monitoring, ecotoxicological and socioeconomic impact of major oil spills such as the 2010 Deepwater Horizon and 2015 Refugio spills, and quantification of microplastic pollution across the planet. Anderson co-directs the Aerial and Aquatic Robot Research team which has now grown into a large group of multidisciplinary faculty and students working on various coastal efforts from over the horizon monitoring of Marine Protected Areas to long-term oil seep impacts from wildfires.

The character of Sean Anderson (played by actor Josh Hutcherson) in the Journey to the Center of the Earth franchise, was named after Anderson.

Anderson currently chairs the Environmental Science and Resource Management Program at California State University Channel Islands.
