= Susan Martonosi =

American mathematician

Susan Elizabeth Martonosi is an American mathematician who works at Harvey Mudd College as the Joseph B. Platt Professor of Mathematics and as the director of the Global Clinic Program at Harvey Mudd. Her research studies operations research, game theory, social networks, and their applications to counter-terrorism, epidemiology, and sports analytics.

== Education and career ==
Martonosi studied operations research and industrial engineering at Cornell University, graduating summa cum laude in 1999. She completed her Ph.D. in operations research at the Massachusetts Institute of Technology in 2005. Her dissertation, An Operations Research Approach to Aviation Security, was supervised by Arnold I. Barnett.

She joined Harvey Mudd College as an assistant professor in 2005, and was named Joseph B. Platt Chaired Professor for Teaching Excellence in 2014, while still an associate professor. She was promoted to full professor in 2017.

Martonosi has also been active in the leadership of INFORMS, including terms as chair of the Academic Programs Database Committee and as president of the Forum on Women in OR/MS.

== Recognition ==
In 2012, Martonosi won the Henry L. Alder Award of the Mathematical Association of America, given annually for "distinguished teaching by a beginning college or university mathematics faculty member".
