= Math circle =

Extracurricular activity

A math circle is an extracurricular activity intended to enrich students' understanding of mathematics. The concept of math circle came into being in the erstwhile USSR and Bulgaria, around 1907, with the goal of "discover future mathematicians and scientists and to train them from the earliest possible age".

== Characteristics ==
Math circles can have a variety of styles. Some are very informal, with the learning proceeding through games, stories, or hands-on activities. Others are more traditional enrichment classes but without formal examinations. Some have a strong emphasis on preparing for Olympiad competitions; some avoid competition as much as possible. Models can use any combination of these techniques, depending on the audience, the mathematician, and the environment of the circle. Athletes have sports teams through which to deepen their involvement with sports; math circles can play a similar role for kids who like to think. Two features all math circles have in common are (1) that they are composed of students who want to be there - either like math, or want to like math, and (2) that they give students a social context in which to enjoy mathematics.

== History ==
Mathematical enrichment activities in the United States have been around since sometime before 1977, in the form of residential summer programs, math contests, and local school-based programs. The concept of a math circle, on the other hand, with its emphasis on convening professional mathematicians and secondary school students regularly to solve problems, appeared in the U.S. in 1994 with Robert and Ellen Kaplan at Harvard University. This form of mathematical outreach made its way to the U.S. most directly from the former Soviet Union and present-day Russia and Bulgaria. They first appeared in the Soviet Union during the 1930s; they have existed in Bulgaria since sometime before 1907. The tradition arrived in the U.S. with émigrés who had received their inspiration from math circles as teenagers. Many of them successfully climbed the academic ladder to secure positions within universities, and a few pioneers among them decided to initiate math circles within their communities to preserve the tradition which had been so pivotal in their own formation as mathematicians. These days, math circles frequently partner with other mathematical education organizations, such as CYFEMAT: The International Network of Math Circles and Festivals, the Julia Robinson Mathematics Festival, and the Mandelbrot Competition.

== Content choices ==
Decisions about content are difficult for newly forming math circles and clubs, or for parents seeking groups for their children.

'Project-based clubs may spend a few meetings building origami, developing a math trail in their town, or programming a math-like computer game together. Math-rich projects may be artistic, exploratory, applied to sciences, executable (software-based), business-oriented, or directed at fundamental contributions to local communities. Museums, cultural and business clubs, tech groups, online networks, artists/musicians/actors active in the community, and other individual professionals can make math projects especially real and meaningful. Increasingly, math clubs invite remote participation of active people (authors, community leaders, professionals) through webinars and teleconferencing software.

Problem-solving circles get together to pose and solve math problems the partecipants find interesting, deep, or meaningful. Problems considered "good" are easy to pose, challenging to solve, require connections among several concepts and techniques, and lead to significant math ideas. Best problem-solving practices include:

- Metacognition (managing memory and attention)
- Grouping problems by type and conceptual connections (e.g. "river crossing problems")
- Moving between more general and abstract problems and particular, simpler examples
- Collaboration with other club members, with current online communities, and with past mathematicians through the media they contributed to the culture.

'Guided exploration circles use self-discovery and the Socratic method to probe deep questions. Robert & Ellen Kaplan, in their book Out of the Labyrinth: Setting Mathematics Free, make a case for this format describing the non-profit Cambridge/Boston Math Circle they founded in 1994 at the Harvard University. The book describes the classroom, organizational and practical issues the Kaplans faced in founding their Math Circle. The meetings encourage a free discussion of ideas; while the content is mathematically rigorous, the atmosphere is friendly and relaxed. The philosophy of the teachers is, "What you have been obliged to discover by yourself leaves a path in your mind which you can use again when the need arises" (G. C. Lichtenberg). Children are encouraged to ask exploratory questions. Are there numbers between numbers? What's geometry like with no parallel lines? Can you tile a square with squares all of the different sizes?

Research mathematicians and connecting students with them can be a focus of math circles. Students in these circles can attain skills such as generalizing problems, continue asking deeper questions, seeing similarities across different examples and so on.

Topic-centered clubs follow math themes such as modular arithmetic, fractals, or linearity. Club members write and read essays, pose and solve problems, create and study definitions, construct example spaces, and investigate applications of their current topic. There are lists of established math club topics that are especially high in connections. While established topics can offer a large volume of educational resources, the introduction of newer or more esoteric subjects can allow for these clubs to explore less documented areas of mathematics.

Applied math clubs center on a field other than mathematics, such as math for thespians, computer programming math, or musical math. Such clubs need strong leadership both for the mathematical parts and for the other field part. Such clubs can meet at an artists' studio, at a game design company, at a theater or another authentic professional setting. More examples of applied math pathways include history, storytelling, art, inventing and tinkering, toy and game design, robotics, origami, and natural sciences.

Most circles and clubs mix some features of the above types. For example, the Metroplex Math Circle, Arnold & Marsden Mathematical Olympiad Circle (AMMOC) have a combination of problem-solving and research, and the New York Math Circle is some combination of a problem-solving circle and a topic-centered club, with vestiges of a research circle.

One can expect problem-solving groups to attract kids already strong in math and confident in their math abilities. On the other hand, math anxious kids will be more likely to try project-based or applied clubs. Topic-centered clubs typically work with kids who can all work at about the same level. The decision about the type of the club strongly depends on your target audience.

== Competition decisions ==
Math competitions involve comparing speed, depth, or accuracy of math work among several people or groups. Traditionally, European competitions are more depth-oriented, and Asian and North American competitions are more speed-oriented, especially for younger children. The vast majority of math competitions involve solving closed ended (known answers) problems, however, there are also essay, project and software competitions. As with all tests requiring limited time, the problems focus more on the empirical accuracy and foundations of mathematics work rather than an extension of basic knowledge. More often than not, competition differs entirely from curricular mathematics in requiring creativity in elementary applications—so that although there may be closed answers, it takes significant extension of mathematical creativity in order to successfully achieve the ends.

For people like Robert and Ellen Kaplan, competition carries with it a negative connotation and corollary of greed for victory rather than an appreciation of mathematics. However, those who run math circles centering mostly on competition rather than seminars and lessons attest that this is a large assumption. Rather, participants grow in their appreciation of math via math competitions such as the AMC, AIME, USAMO, and ARML.

Some math circles are completely devoted to preparing teams or individuals for particular competitions. The biggest plus of the competition framework for a circle organizer is the ready-made set of well-defined goals. The competition provides a time and task management structure, and easily defined progress tracking. This is also the biggest minus of competition-based mathematics, because defining goals and dealing with complexity and chaos are important in all real-world endeavors. Competitive math circles attract students who are already strong and confident in mathematics, but also welcome those who wish to engage in the mathematics competitive world. Beyond the age of ten or so, they also attract significantly more males than females, and in some countries, their racial composition is disproportionate to the country's demographic.

Collaborative math clubs are more suitable for kids who are anxious about mathematics, need "math therapy" because of painful past experiences, or want to have more casual and artistic relationships with mathematics. A playgroup or a coop that does several activities together, including a math club, usually chooses collaborative or hybrid models that are more likely to accommodate all members already in the group.

Most math circles and clubs combine some competitive and some collaborative activities. For example, many math circles, while largely centering on competitions, host seasonal tournaments and infuse their competition seminars with fun mathematical lessons.

== See also ==
- Carolina Benedetti
- Zvezdelina Stankova
- Lauren Lynn Rose
