= List of mathematics competitions =

Mathematics competitions or mathematical olympiads are competitive events where participants complete a math test. These tests may require multiple choice or numeric answers, or a detailed written solution or proof.

== International mathematics competitions ==
- Championnat International de Jeux Mathématiques et Logiques — for all ages, mainly for French-speaking countries, but participation is not limited by language.
- China Girls Mathematical Olympiad (CGMO) — held annually for teams of girls representing different regions within China and a few other countries.
- European Girls' Mathematical Olympiad (EGMO) — since April 2012.
- Integration Bee — competition in integral calculus held in various institutions of higher learning in the United States and some other countries.
- International Mathematical Modeling Challenge — team contest for high school students.
- International Mathematical Olympiad (IMO) — the oldest international Olympiad, occurring annually since 1959.
- International Mathematics Competition for University Students (IMC) — international competition for undergraduate students.
- Mathematical Contest in Modeling (MCM) — team contest for undergraduates.
- Mathematical Kangaroo — worldwide competition.
- Mental Calculation World Cup — contest for the best mental calculators.
- Primary Mathematics World Contest (PMWC) — worldwide competition.
- Rocket City Math League (RCML) — Competition run by students at Virgil I. Grissom High School with levels ranging from Explorer (Pre-Algebra) to Discovery (Comprehensive).
- Romanian Master of Mathematics and Sciences — Olympiad for the selection of the top 20 countries in the last IMO.
- Tournament of the Towns — worldwide competition based in Russia.
- The SUPERTMATIK Mental Math International Competition — worldwide competition, Grades 1 - 9.
- World Mathematics Invitational — for all grade levels K-12, Taiwanese-based international mathematics competition, with English and Chinese as the official languages of the papers.

== Multinational regional mathematics competitions ==
- Asian Pacific Mathematics Olympiad (APMO) — Pacific rim
- Asia International Mathematical Olympiad (AIMO) — Held in Asia, organised by the Hong Kong Mathematical Olympiad Association.
- Balkan Mathematical Olympiad — for students from Balkan area.
- Baltic Way — Baltic Sea regions
- Mediterranean Mathematics Competition — Olympiad for countries in the Mediterranean zone.
- Noetic Learning math contest — United States and Canada (primary schools)
- Nordic Mathematical Contest (NMC) — the five Nordic countries
- North East Asian Mathematics Competition (NEAMC) — North-East Asia
- Pan African Mathematics Olympiads (PAMO)
- South East Asian Mathematics Competition (SEAMC) — South-East Asia
- William Lowell Putnam Mathematical Competition — United States and Canada

== National mathematics olympiads ==
=== Australia ===
- Australian Mathematics Competition, run by the Australian Maths Trust
- Australian Mathematics Olympiad - Invite-only competition for top performing students in Australia, used to select the individuals who will sit the team selection test for the opportunity to represent Australia at the International Mathematical Olympiad

=== Bangladesh ===
- Bangladesh Mathematical Olympiad (Jatiyo Gonit Utshob)

=== Belgium ===
- Olympiade Mathématique Belge — competition for French-speaking students in Belgium
- Vlaamse Wiskunde Olympiade — competition for Dutch-speaking students in Belgium

=== Brazil ===
- Olimpíada Brasileira de Matemática (OBM) — national competition open to all students from sixth grade to university
- Olimpíada Brasileira de Matemática das Escolas Públicas (OBMEP) — national competition open to public-school students from fourth grade to high school

=== Canada ===
- Canadian Open Mathematics Challenge — Canada's premier national mathematics competition open to any student with an interest in and grasp of high school math and organised by Canadian Mathematical Society
- Canadian Mathematical Olympiad (CMO) — competition whose top performers represent Canada at the International Mathematical Olympiad
- The Centre for Education in Mathematics and Computing (CEMC) based out of the University of Waterloo hosts long-standing national competitions for grade levels 7–12
- MathChallengers (formerly MathCounts BC) — for eighth, ninth, and tenth grade students

=== China ===
- Chinese Mathematical Olympiad (CMO)

=== France ===
- Concours général — competition whose mathematics portion is open to twelfth grade students

=== Hong Kong ===
- Hong Kong Mathematics Olympiad
- Hong Kong Mathematical High Achievers Selection Contest — for students from Form 1 to Form 3
- Pui Ching Invitational Mathematics Competition
- Primary Mathematics World Contest

=== Hungary ===
- Miklós Schweitzer Competition
- Középiskolai Matematikai Lapok — correspondence competition for students from 9th–12th grade
- National Secondary School Academic Competition – Mathematics

=== India ===
- National Mathematics Talent Contests
- Indian Olympiad Qualifier in Mathematics
- Regional Mathematical Olympiad
- Indian National Mathematical Olympiad

=== Indonesia ===
- National Science Olympiad (Olimpiade Sains Nasional) — includes mathematics along with various science topics

=== Kenya ===
- Moi National Mathematics Contest — prepared and hosted by Mang'u High School but open to students from all Kenyan high schools

=== Nigeria ===
- Cowbellpedia — sponsored by Promasidor Nigeria, open to students from eight to eighteen, at public and private schools in Nigeria.

=== Philippines ===
- Philippine Math Olympiad, the selection event of the Mathematical Society of the Philippines for the Philippine IMO team

=== Saudi Arabia ===
- KFUPM mathematics olympiad – organized by King Fahd University of Petroleum and Minerals (KFUPM).

=== Singapore ===
- Southeast Asian Mathematical Olympiad (SEAMO) — a high level mathematics competition for school students, questions are written by Mr Terry Chew.
- Singapore Mathematical Olympiad (SMO) — organized by the Singapore Mathematical Society, the competition is open to all pre-university students in Singapore.
- Singapore and Asian Schools Math Olympiad (SASMO) Since 2006.

=== South Africa ===
- University of Cape Town Mathematics Competition — open to students in grades 8 through 12 in the Western Cape province.

=== United States ===
==== National elementary school competitions (K–5) and higher ====
- Math League (grades 4–12)
- Mathematical Olympiads for Elementary and Middle Schools (MOEMS) (grades 4–6 and 7–8)
- Noetic Learning math contest (grades 2-8)
- Pi Math Contest (for elementary, middle and high school students)

==== National middle school competitions (grades 6–8) and lower/higher ====
- American Mathematics Contest 8 (AMC->8), formerly the American Junior High School Mathematics Examination (AJHSME)
- Math League (grades 4–12)
- MATHCOUNTS
- Mathematical Olympiads for Elementary and Middle Schools (MOEMS)
- Noetic Learning math contest (grades 2-8)
- Pi Math Contest (for elementary, middle and high school students)
- Rocket City Math League (pre-algebra to calculus)
- United States of America Mathematical Talent Search (USAMTS)

==== National high school competitions (grade 9–12) and lower ====
- American Invitational Mathematics Examination (AIME)
- American Mathematics Contest 10 (AMC 10)
- American Mathematics Contest 12 (AMC 12), formerly the American High School Mathematics Examination (AHSME)
- American Regions Mathematics League (ARML)
- Harvard-MIT Mathematics Tournament (HMMT)
- iTest
- High School Mathematical Contest in Modeling (HiMCM)
- Math League (grades 4–12)
- Math-O-Vision (grades 9–12)
- Math Prize for Girls
- MathWorks Math Modeling Challenge
- Mu Alpha Theta
- Pi Math Contest (for elementary, middle and high school students)
- United States of America Mathematical Olympiad (USAMO)
- United States of America Mathematical Talent Search (USAMTS)
- Rocket City Math League (pre-algebra to calculus)

==== National college competitions ====
- AMATYC Mathematics Contest
- Mathematical Contest in Modeling (MCM)
- William Lowell Putnam Mathematical Competition

=== Spain ===
- Liga Matemática, mathematics competition organized by the National Association of Mathematics Students

=== Vietnam ===
- Kì thi Học sinh giỏi Quốc gia môn Toán — hosted annually by Vietnamese Ministry of Education and Training for high-schoolers around the nation. Consists of 2 rounds, the best-scorers of Round 1 will proceed to Round 2 in order to qualify for the country's various math Olympiads teams.

== See also ==
- Competitive programming
- Mathematical software
- Project Euler — computational mathematics and computer programming problem solving website
