= International Mathematical Olympiad selection process =

Selections by country for student contest

This article describes the selection process, by country, for entrance into the International Mathematical Olympiad.

The International Mathematical Olympiad (IMO) is an annual mathematics olympiad for students younger than 20 who have not started at university.

Each year, participating countries send at most 6 students. The selection process varies between countries, but typically involves several rounds of competition, each progressively more difficult, after which the number of candidates is repeatedly reduced until the final 6 are chosen.

Many countries also run training events for IMO potential participants, with the aim of improving performance as well as assisting with team selection.

== IMO selection process by country ==
=== Argentina ===
In Argentina, the Olimpíada Matemática Argentina is organized each year by Fundación Olimpíada Matemática Argentina. All students that took and passed the National Finals (fifth and last round of the competition) exams, usually held in November; and were born before July 1 21 years ago, are allowed to take two new written tests to be selected for IMO, usually in May. From the results of that tests, six titular students and a number of substitutes are selected to represent Argentina at the International Mathematical Olympiad.

=== Australia ===
In Australia, selection into the IMO team is determined by the Australian Mathematics Trust and is based on the results from the following exams:

- The Australian Mathematics Olympiad
- The Asian Pacific Mathematics Olympiad
- IMO selection exams in the AMOC Selection School in April

The Australian Mathematical Olympiad (AMO) is held annually in the second week of February. It is composed of two four-hour papers held over two consecutive days. There are four questions in each exam for a total of eight questions. Entry is by invitation only, with approximately 200 candidates per year from Australia and New Zealand.

The top 25 from the AMO are invited to sit the Asian Pacific Mathematics Olympiad, a four-hour exam with five questions held a month after the AMO.

About 80 students are chosen for the AMOC Selection School which is held in April of each year. Students are invited to either the Senior, Intermediate, or Junior Stream. At this school, the Senior students take Team Selection Tests (consisting of 12 questions with 3 in each 4.5-hour test) and 6 students plus one reserve are selected for the International Mathematical Olympiad (IMO). There is a mentor program for the Australian teams prior to the EGMO and IMO.

=== Bangladesh ===
The selection process is organised by Bangladesh Mathematical Olympiad. There are four levels of selection in Bangladesh. The students can participate in four academic categories: primary, junior, secondary and higher secondary.

- Preliminary Selection: This is the first step of the selection. This is mainly done in district level. The selected contestants then go for the divisional round. Students are given 7 problems and have to solve them with in 1hr 15mins.
- Divisional: Currently (2011) the country is divided in 13 regions for divisional Olympiad. The number of divisions may increase later. Roughly 5,500 students participate each of the divisional Olympiads and 40 are selected for the next level. In Dhaka division, where number of students are more than the others, 11,000 students participate and 60 to 70 students are selected.
  All problems in the divisional test are "To find" problems. The students need not to write down the solution, only the answer is necessary. The test is usually one hour long.
- National: The national Olympiad is a 3-4 hour test depending on the category. In this test the students must write down the solutions of the problems. Some of the winners from junior, secondary and higher secondary categories of this level are selected for the next level.

Cut-marks depend on overall performance of every participants in this level.

- The camps: More than one camps are arranged to select students for IMO. The selection process in the camps isn't as straight forward as it is in the Olympiads. The students in the camps are closely monitored by the previous campers and coaches and four to six students are selected for IMO.

=== Brazil ===
The Brazilian participants are selected in a two phase process:

- The contestants, from 8th grade onwards, that are awarded medals or honorable mentions in the Brazilian Mathematical Olympiad (OBM) (Olimpíada Brasileira de Matemática) of the year before the IMO are selected to participate in a training process.
- The contestants then take a series of tests, which are of similar level to the IMO, and the six students who perform best are invited to join the Brazilian team that goes to IMO.

=== Belgium ===
The Belgian team is bilingual. The Dutch-speaking community selects three participants during the Vlaamse Wiskunde Olympiade. The French-speaking community selects their three participants through the [Olympiade Mathématique Belge] and additional tests at training weekends.

=== Canada ===
High school students must first write the Canadian Open Mathematics Challenge, which takes place around November. If they score high enough in the COMC(normally 60+), they will be invited to write the Canadian Mathematics Olympiad (CMO), Asian Pacific Mathematics Olympiad (APMO), IMO TST, and unofficially write the USAMO.

The students with the top scores (conditions permitting) will make the Canadian team and travel to the location of the IMO in that year. Although the team is made up of students from all over Canada, Toronto and its suburbs have produced the most people for the team due to its high population density. The Canadian Mathematical Society is the organization which selects team leaders and members for the IMO team.

=== China ===
In mainland China, high school students can participate in the annual National High School Mathematics Competition held on the second Sunday of September. However, unofficial provincial preliminary tests may be held to pre-select students for the competition.

The competition consists of two tests: the first test is 80 minutes long and covers the high school mathematics syllabus, while the second test is 170 minutes long, consists of 4 proof questions, and covers topics in contest mathematics. The top-scoring competitors from each province, usually 3 to 5 (but for very strong provinces, it can be up to 15), will be invited to participate in the Chinese Mathematical Olympiad held in November or December.

In recent years, the provincial quotas have increased; for instance, the quotas for CMO 2023 ranged from 6 to 26. Top 15 contestants from the China Girls Mathematical Olympiad are invited to the CMO, as well as past national training squad members.

The CMO has the same format as the IMO but is graded in 3-point increments to give a total score of 126 points. Approximately the top 60 competitors of CMO will be selected for the national training squad and attend the training camp, which is divided into two separate stages, each 8 to 9 days long. All national training squad members are exempted from Gaokao to let them focus on competition preparation. During the first stage of the camp, they will take two sets of IMO-style selection tests, with 4 papers in total. Then the top 15 competitors in the first stage will be selected for the second stage of the camp held at a different place some time later, during which they will take another two sets of IMO-style selection tests. At the end of the second stage, the 6 students with the highest combined scores in the four selection tests will form the Chinese team.

=== Colombia ===
In Colombia the selection and preparation of students for math competitions is organized by Olimpiadas Colombianas de Matemáticas. Students are split into levels based on their age and grade, splitting them into Primer Nivel(Grades 6-7), Nivel Intermedio(Grades 8-9) and Nivel Superior(Grades 10-11). The process begins with the regional competitions which are held in October and November. The best students of these competitions are invited to the January Training Session. In early March the National Competition or Olimpiada Colombiana de Matemáticas begins. It consists of a sequence of four examinations: the clasificatoria, the selectiva, the semifinal(now the final for Primer Nivel students) and the ronda final. The latter contains a (prior) training session and then two days of IMO-style papers.

Every Colombian high school student can take part in the first "classifying" examination but afterwards students are invited to compete according to their results on the previous examination. The three best students of the three different high school levels of the final round examination are the winners of the Colombian Math Olympiad. Although in principle students of the lower levels may be selected to go to the IMO, it generally takes many years before they can compete with students of the highest level or nivel superior. After the National Competition the twenty best students of each level are invited to the June Training Session where students undergo the IMO selection process.

=== Croatia ===
Hrvatsko matematičko društvo invites about 20 contestants who performed best at the national level (national level competition is separated by age) to the Croatian Mathematical Olympiad (Hrvatska matematička olimpijada, HMO) which consists of 2 days, 4 problems each. The best ~10 are invited to the IMO test, the rest to the MEMO test. The best six at the IMO test and HMO combined are selected for IMO.

=== Cuba ===
In Cuba the selection process consists (depending on regional conditions of availability of resources, participants and organizers) six levels. Competitions are held to select the best candidates from each school, then from each municipality, then from each province who then are allowed to take part in the National Competition (Concurso Nacional in Spanish). The gold and silver medals (around 20 participants) take a number of further exams closer to the level of International competitions. Thirteen of these are selected to form the National Pre-Selection that trains for up to three months taking also exams out of which the best 6 are selected to form the National team. In a number of years the lack of financial support has allowed only the first member of the team to actually travel and compete in the International mathematical Olympiad.

=== Cyprus ===
In Cyprus four provincial competitions and a national (Pancyprian) competition are held every year. During this procedure 30 students are selected and four Team Selection Tests are held to determine who will be the six members of the national team. In every competition or test there are four problem usually covering geometry, number theory, algebra, and combinatorics (elementary level) and last four hours each.

=== Czech Republic ===
After successfully completing the school and regional rounds, roughly 50 best participants are invited to the national round, where 10 best students are selected to participate in a week-long selection campus. Each day they solve a set of 3-4 problems, taken mainly from the past national olympiads of various countries. On the last day they have to find the answers (this time in form of a number) to rather large set of shorter problems under significant time-pressure. After that the team is selected and before the actual IMO, it competes in traditional Czech-Slovak-Polish Mathematical Contest where the participants can practise their skill under almost identical conditions to IMO.

=== Denmark ===
In Denmark a national contest open to all high school students is held every year called "Georg Mohr-Konkurrencen" (the Georg Mohr Contest) named after a Danish mathematician. The top scorers are invited to the winner seminar test. The top 20 students are invited to the NMC. After this a preliminary team is chosen for the IMO-TST.

=== France ===
The Association Animath, and more precisely the Olympiade Française de Mathématiques prepares and selects the French IMO team. Students who succeed at a preselection test can get from Animath a year-long training. The team is selected based on the results of numerous IMO type tests throughout the year.

=== Germany ===
IMO team selection in Germany is based on the main national mathematical competitions: The Bundeswettbewerb Mathematik (BWM, the former west German olympiad), the Deutsche Mathematik-Olympiade (DeMO, the former east German olympiad), and Jugend forscht (a research competition). Students successful in any of these competitions (e. g. a prize in the second round of the BWM) write two 3-hour exams at their schools, and the 16 best scorers of these exams are invited to a training program consisting of five seminars, where lectures are given and seven team selection tests are written - 4-hour exams determining the actual IMO contestants (additional tests are possible if the team is not uniquely determined after the seven exams).

=== Greece ===
- Θαλής (Thalis) - first round
- Ευκλείδης (Euklidis) - second round
- Αρχιμήδης (Archimidis) - third round

=== Hong Kong ===
Hong Kong first joined IMO in 1988.

Students can join IMO Training if they meet (at least one) of the requirements below:

- Acquiring Distinction in ‘Introduction to Olympiad Mathematics’ (ITOM) course held by HKAGE in at least 1 Phase
- Participating in China Girls Mathematical Olympiad (CGMO) Training held by HKAGE
- Getting Honourable Mention, Bronze, Silver or Gold in International Mathematical Olympiad Preliminary Selection Contest - Hong Kong (also known as ‘Prelim’)

A total of 60-70 students will be selected to receive further training. Students are placed in either Level 1 (about 50 students) or Level 2 (about 20 students) training, while the students who completed Level 1 in the previous year are usually promoted to Level 2. There are three Phases in the training (Phase I: July to August; Phase II: September to December; Phase III: January to March). The Phase tests are:

- Test 1 with 6 proof-based problems which questions are similar to Prelim's in August
- Iranian Geometry Olympiad (IGO) (Not compulsory) with 5 proof-based problems in October
- Test 2 with 4 proof-based problems in October
- Hong Kong (China) Mathematical Olympiad with 4 proof-based problems in December
- Asian Pacific Mathematics Olympiad with 5 proof-based problems in March

18 students are then chosen according to their results in all the Phase tests and Prelim to attend the additional tests, Test 3 and Test 4 in late April or May. 6 HK Team members and 6 alternate team members are then selected to join the Pre-IMO Intensive Training (also known as ‘Phase IV’) according to their results in all the tests mentioned above. The six HK team members will then join IMO.

In addition, 6 students are selected to join the Chinese Mathematical Olympiad (CMO) according to their results in the Phase tests in Phase I and II, and Prelim.

In the past, students are selected to join the China Western Mathematical Olympiad (CWMO), but IMOHKC has stopped sending representatives to CWMO.

Unlike mainland China and Taiwan, there are no specific policies for university admission for students representing Hong Kong SAR in the IMO and other mathematics competitions. There was a case of an IMO team member denied a university place in Hong Kong by the University Grants Committee due to unsatisfactory grade in a language subject in the public examination.

=== Iceland ===
Iceland first joined the IMO in 1985.

In Iceland, the Icelandic Mathematical Olympiad for Secondary School Students (Stærðfræðikeppni Framhaldsskólanema) was first held in the winter of 1984–1985, and it has been an annual occurrence ever since. It is hosted by the Icelandic Mathematical Organization and the Natural Sciences's Teacher Association. Its goals include increasing the interest of Icelandic secondary school students towards mathematics, and other fields built on a mathematical foundation.

The contest is held in two parts every winter. First, a qualifier held in October of every year on two difficulty levels; upper level, and lower level. The lower level is intended for first year secondary school students, and the upper level for older students. Those who do well in the qualifier are invited to the final competition, held in March.

Alongside honours and awards, the top students are selected to perform in various mathematical olympiads, including the Baltic Way, the Nordic Mathematical Contest, and the International Mathematical Olympiad.

=== India ===
India has been participating in the IMO since 1989. The National Board for Higher Mathematics (NBHM) is in charge of the mathematical olympiad activity which has put Homi Bhabha Centre for Science Education (HBCSE) in-charge for the implementation.

The selection process consists of four stages: However, the programme itself is of six stages.

- Stage 1 or Indian Olympiad Qualifiers in Mathematics: After the pandemic, the PRMO was renamed IOQM. The examination paper comprises 30 problems to be solved over 3 Hours. The composition of the paper is 2 marker, 3 marker, and 5 marker problems.
- Stage 2 or Regional Mathematical Olympiad: The RMO is held between late October and early November across the country. The examination paper comprises six problems to be solved over 3 hours. The RMO examination was discontinued for a few years after the pandemic and was restarted in 2023. The top 30 students from grades 8–11, the top 6 students from grade 12, and an additional 5 girl students from grades 8-11 from each region qualify for writing the INMO, the third stage exam.
- Stage 3 or Indian National Mathematical Olympiad: The INMO is held on the third Sunday of January at 28 centers across the country. The examination paper comprises six problems to be solved over four and a half hours(From 2024 onwards). The top students from the INMO (approximately 35) are invited for the Fourth stage.
- Stage 4 or International Mathematical Olympiad Training Camp: It is held at HBCSE from April to May. At this camp, orientation is provided to students by resource persons from different institutions across the country. Several selection tests are held during this camp. Based on the performance in these tests, 6 students are selected to represent India at the IMO.
- Stage 5 or Pre Departure camp for IMO:The selected team of 6 students goes through another round of training and orientation for about 10 days prior to departure for IMO.
- Stage 6 or IMO: The Olympiad program culminates with the participation of the students in the IMO. 4 teachers or mentors accompany the students.

=== Indonesia ===
In Indonesia, National Mathematical Olympiad is held as a part of National Science Olympiad (Olimpiade Sains Nasional), and has been held annually since 2002. About 100-120 students who pass the province-level test will be eligible to participate in the National Mathematical Olympiad, which is held in August or September. About thirty students are chosen to get into the first training camp, which is held at October through November. About half of them will go to second training camp and participate in the Asian Pacific Mathematics Olympiad. At the end, six students are selected to represent the country. The selection depends on the results of regular tests held every week in every training camp, IMO simulation test and APMO.

=== Ireland ===
In Ireland, the top scorers in the Junior Certificate (a state exam taken around the age of 15–16) are invited by the various universities to take part in the Irish Mathematical Olympiad. The IrMO is held simultaneously in May in each of these universities. The test consists of two three-hour papers, each containing five questions, run on the same day. The top six students are selected for the national team.

=== Israel ===
As of 2023, the Weizmann Institute of Science is the academic institution that is responsible for the selection process.

The selection process is based on the four main national math competitions in Israel:

- The Ministry of Education's national mathematical Olympiad, which is open to all Israeli students and consists of two stages. The first stage is hosted on the ministry's website, this stage does not require full proofs. The next stage takes place simultaneously in a few academic institutions in Israel for the students who passed the first stage. Approximately 600 students participate in this stage each year.
- The Gillis Olympiad in the Weizmann Institute of Science.
- The Grossman Math Olympiad in the Technion – Israel Institute of Technology.
- The Tournament of the Towns, which consists of 2 rounds: Fall (October) and Spring (February–March). Only the first round is considered for the selection process, except for special cases.

To qualify for the final stage of the selection process, students must excel in one of these competitions. Approximately 100-200 students are invited to participate in the final stage, which is conducted at the Weizmann Institute of Science. The top 50 scoring students in this stage compose Israel's national mathematics team.

=== Italy ===
In Italy, the Italian Mathematical Olympiad is held every year; the full selection process is made up of four stages:

- the so-called Archimedean games, held as a multiple-choice test in all participating high schools in November
- the regional stage, held as a mixed test (multiple choice, numerical answers and proof-writing) in ca. 100 sites in February
- the national stage, held in Cesenatico at the beginning of May, composed of six problems requiring a full proof
- the team selection test, held in Pisa at the end of May after a five-day stage, composed of two sessions each containing three problems requiring a full proof.

The six-person team competing in the IMO is determined by summing up the scores of four different competitions: the senior national stage, held each September in Pisa, the Balkan selection test held each February in Pisa (also selecting the team competing in the BMO and in the RMM) composed by two papers with three problems, four and a half hours each, and then the national stage and the May stage held in Pisa.

=== Japan ===
In Japan, the Japan Mathematical Olympiad (JMO) is held every year. JMO has two rounds: the first one in November and the second one in February. The Junior Japan Mathematical Olympiad (JJMO) is also held for middle-schoolers. The best 20 scorers in JMO, as well as the best 5 scorers in JJMO, are invited to the spring training camp in March. The top six students in several tests at this camp are selected for the national team.

=== Kosovo ===
In Kosovo, there are many stages to the selection process:

1. Every school picks their top students using their own process (the number of top students varies each year)
2. Every municipality chooses 4 of their top students.
3. The Kosovar Mathematical Society chooses 5 of the best competitors from the country for each grade (OMK/Kosovar Mathematical Olympiad)
4. The Kosovar Mathematical Society hosts the TST (Team Selection Test) which selects the 6 best people from all grades which will be part of the IMO team. If there is a tie another TST is held.

=== Latvia ===
In Latvia a national contest open to all high school students takes place each year. The best participants of regional contests are allowed to participate in the national olympiad held in Riga. The top students are further tested to select the national team.

=== Liechtenstein ===
The Liechtenstein team is selected via performances in the Swiss Mathematical Olympiad.

=== Malaysia ===
The selection is based on the IMONST (International Math Olympiad National Selection Test) and the subsequent training camps. Top IMONST performers are selected to attend the training camps, and the final IMO representatives are selected based on the students' performance in the camps and race.

=== Mexico ===
The selecting process in Mexico has 3 stages and is organized by the Mexican Mathematical Olimpiad. At first stage, each of the 32 states select a team of up to 6 students which will represent the state in the national contest. The contest is held once at year, in the month of November. According to the results of this contest, at least 16 students are selected, who will continue to the second stage of the selecting process, the national trainings, which are held from November to April in which the group of 16 students gets reduced to approximately 10. In May the third stage of the contest is held, in which the six students that will represent Mexico in the next IMO. In similar process the teams for the Centroamerican and Caribbean Mathematical Olimpiad (OMCC) and Iberoamerican Mathematical Olimpiad (OIM) are selected. In March the test for the APMO is solved.

=== Netherlands ===
In the Netherlands the selecting process consists of three rounds.

- The first round takes place on high schools. It contains 8 multiple-choice questions, and 4 open questions.
- The second round takes place at twelve different universities. It contains 5 questions where the answer is a certain number and 2 open questions.
- There are a few optional training days and then the third round takes place at the Eindhoven University of Technology. It contains 5 open questions.
- The best 30 are invited to the training program. Throughout the next year the students take different test: the best 6 students will go to the IMO. The tests contains 4 or 5 open questions.

=== New Zealand ===
The first selection is based on NZMO1, after which some of the students are invited to take the NZMO2. The top 24 students are then selected and invited to a residential one week training camp. At the end of the camp, approximately 12 students are selected as a squad. The squad receives regular assignments to complete every few weeks as well as sitting the British Maths Olympiad, Australian Maths Olympiad and the APMO. The final six candidates plus one reserve are later selected based on results of the assignments and these tests.

=== Norway ===
In Norway, the Niels Henrik Abels Matematikkonkurranse is held each year. The first selection, usually in November, consist of a multiple-choice exam with 20 problems. One is given 5 points for each correct answer, 1 point for each unanswered problem and 0 point for a wrong answer. Approximately 10% of the competing students are selected for the second selection, which is held in January. The examination consist of 10 problems, giving 10 points for each correct answer, who are integers between zero and one thousand. 20 students are then selected for a final four-hour-long examination consisting of four problems. While usually the 3 best students are automatically chosen for the final team, the rest 3 are decided by their results in the Nordic Mathematical Contest, which they will compete in afterwards.

=== Pakistan ===
In Pakistan, selection for the IMO participants is quite similar to that in other countries. The process starts around one year before a particular IMO; and a test, NMTC (national mathematics talent contest), is taken by the high school students which is organized by the Higher Education Commission of Pakistan. The test is held in June and the results are announced by September or October. About fifty to seventy students out of a 4000 are selected which are called by COMSTATS University Islamabad, Lahore Campus - usually in November. The fifty to seventy selectees are taught at the school for a week or two and are then tested at the last two days of the camp. This process, involving the top 50, is known as First Camp. Based on the performance in the test, about 20 students are further selected for the Second Camp, and the rest are dropped. The finalised participants for IMO are selected at this second camp or at a possible Third Camp.

In 2025, a 3-day girls-only pre-IMO Training Camp was organised, inviting the next top 40 girls who were not invited to the actual IMO Training Camp. The top 3-4 girls from a selection test on the last day qualified for the IMO Training Camp a week later.

Sometimes, the selection process may involve more than three camps and the number of students selected per camp can vary from the figures provided above.

=== The Philippines ===
The selection process starts with the Philippine Mathematical Olympiad (PMO), which includes a qualifying stage, an area stage, and a national stage. The National Finalists (roughly the top twenty) of the PMO will be invited to a two-month training camp. The top students (at most six) in the selection tests given during this training camp will make up the IMO team.

=== Poland ===
In Poland the selection is based on the results of the Polish Mathematical Olympiad, which includes a qualifying stage, a regional stage, and a national stage. Top 6 students of the national stage qualify to the IMO. In case of a draw, either the results of a regional stage or the run-off during a training camp for the IMO can be used.

=== Portugal ===
In Portugal, there are four selection steps. The three first are the exams of the Portuguese Mathematics Olympiad and the last is composed of several exams made by Projecto Delfos, who also prepares the students for international competitions.

=== Romania ===
In Romania those that enter the Team Selection Process (4 tests in total; the first one for the enlarged team, the second one for the small team, the third and fourth ones for the team that represents Romania to the IMO) are selected from the Romanian National Mathematical Olympiad (ro. Olimpiada Națională de Matematică/ a României) which consists of four rounds: School (in every school), Local (in every locality; sectors are considered localities), County/Sectors of Bucharest (in every county or sector) and National.

- In the school round and local round (ro. Etapa pe școală; Etapa locală)the advancing pupils are chosen using a minimum grade threshold (usually half of the maximum score). The paper for the school round has no restrictions, but the paper for the local round may consist of 4 problems, a multiple-choice test, or a mixed test, with both elements. The Romanian Mathematical Society recommends that 25% of the paper consists of problems from Gazeta Matematică.
- From the sector/county round (ro. Etapa județeană/a sectoarelor Municipiului București) the first student, which needs to have scored at least 14 points, with a playoff round organised in case of two or more students that got first place, if the advancing student can't be decided using the tie-breaking criteria (number of problems graded with 7s, number of problems graded with 6s, score in the least-solved problem of the paper at county or sector level, score in the local round). The student that gets the higher mark in the playoff will represent the sector/county in the national round. Students that get scores from 17 to 28 receive mentions or awards: First Award, Second Award, Third Award, Mention (ro. Premiul I, Premiul II, Premiul III, Mențiune)
- The national round (ro. Etapa națională) is organised in a city in the country, where the paper consists, like in the sector/county round, of 4 problems with proof-based answers. Each problem is graded out of 7 and therefore 28 is the maximum score. One half of students in each grade receive medals, with the proportions 1/6:1/3:1/2=Gold:Silver:Bronze. Students that got a 7 and did not get a medal receive an Honorable Mention. The students in grades IX-XII that placed top 20 in the round advance to the Team Selection Process, having to take the first Team Selection Test, called either the First Selection Test or the Enlarged Team Selection Test (ro. Primul baraj de selecție / Barajul de selecție al Lotului Național Lărgit). Approximately 25 students qualify for the Enlarged Team (and then, 15 for the small team).

After the national round, the other three TSTs take place, along with training camps (ro. stagii de pregătire ale lotului național).

=== Russia ===
Russia possesses a very extensive system of selecting and training participants for IMO. Different aspects of solving mathematical problems are studied and revealed: combinatorics, logics, structural arrangement and proofs. All problems are evaluated from 7 points. Top participants obtain certificates of 3 degrees ("1st", "2nd" and "3rd diploma") and often additional "commendable certificates". Totally up to half of participants (in the last 2 rounds) gain diplomas.

The official rounds (each picking about 1/3 top of the previous) are: School, Borough, Region, and national. More details:

- School round (Russian: Школьный этап, I stage) is a public stage - every interested pupil of 4-11 grade can participate. Completely organized by every school this competition aimed more at popularisation than at selection.
- Borough round (Russian: Муниципальный этап, II stage) for some schools (specifically ones that has winners of region round) is equal to the School round.
- Region round (Russian: Региональный этап, III stage) is the first which brings together participants in one place to live for some days. It has two rounds on its own. In Moscow they are separated with process of selection, but in less populated regions pupils take part in both. In present days problems for all rounds starting with region round are created by special central committee. There are juries in each region of roughly constant membership. Winners of the region rounds usually have privileges for high-school entering.
- National round (Russian: Заключительный этап, IV stage) aimed at selection the most prominent pupils for participation in IMO. For this sake about 14 top of national round from 10th and 11th grades (usually "1st diplomas") are combined in following summer and winter "gatherings" for special training and further selection.

=== Singapore ===
In Singapore, the SMO (Singapore Mathematical Olympiad) is held with three sections- Junior (Grade 7 and 8), Senior (Grades 9 and 10) and Open (Grades 11 and 12). There are two rounds in each of the competitions and the top 20 SMO (Open) Round 2 scorers will be invited to attend IMO training sessions, from which two IMO-style National Team Selection Tests (NTSTs) will determine the 6 participants in the IMO.

=== South Africa ===
In South Africa those who would be members of the team must pass through a nationwide talent search by correspondence, after which the top fifty or so are selected for a camp (usually in the December holidays) at Stellenbosch University. A number of rounds of monthly problem sets are issued by the University of Cape Town which are taken into consideration, along with the camp marks to select the top fifteen/sixteen to go to a final selection camp at Rhodes University, Grahamstown or more recently the University of the Free State, Bloemfontein in April. A final training camp takes place at the University of Cape Town or more recently, the University of Pretoria just before the IMO. The Asian Pacific Mathematics Olympiad has been used informally as a test, along with an IMO selection test written at the schools of the top fifteen in the event of indecision.

=== Spain ===
In Spain there are two rounds.

The first one is held in each university district. There are two written tests, in which six or eight problems are to be solved, depending on the region. The first three participants in each district go to the national round.

This one also consists of two written tests, three and half hours long each, with a total of six problems. The top six scorers go onto the International Olympiad.

=== Sweden ===
In Sweden, a mathematics contest called "Skolornas Matematiktävling" is held every autumn. Those who qualify to the finale are invited to participate in a correspondence course in problem solving as well as the Nordic Mathematical Contest. From the combined results of the qualification round, the correspondence course and the finale and NMC, the six highest achievers of the Swedish finalists are invited to join the Swedish IMO team.

=== Switzerland ===
In Switzerland, the Swiss Mathematical Olympiad consists of four rounds. The first two rounds narrow down the field to 25 students, who then take the third round in March to determine national medals. Medalists take the Swiss Team Selection Test in May, where the six best performers are picked for the Swiss IMO team.

=== Taiwan ===
In Taiwan, the selection process consists of three sessions, starting from mid March to the end of April. Students who rank among the top 30 in the Taiwanese Mathematical Olympiad test can participate the first session. During each session students will be tested by six IMO-style problems, and top six students will be selected as the members of the Taiwanese IMO team. The training sessions will be held during May and June.

=== Thailand ===
In Thailand, the selection of the IMO representatives is the responsibility of the organization "The Promotion of Academic Olympiad and The Development of Science Education Foundation". There are many branches of this organization around the country. At the end of August, a 30-question exam is open to all high school students to select 60 students to join each camp (there are about 20 camps) in each branch of the country for promoting mathematics skills, known in Thailand as "POSN Camp 1". The topics include Algebra, Geometry, Number Theory, Combinatorics, and Logic. After the camp, an exam is given in each of the preceding topics to evaluate the skills. A number of students, usually 30, are selected to join another camp in March, known in Thailand as "POSN Camp 2". The topics include Algebra, Geometry, Number Theory, and Combinatorics in an advanced level, Functional Equation, and Inequality. After the camp, an exam is given and 6 students are selected from each branch of the country to compete in the Thailand Mathematical Olympiad. Anyone with gold or silver medal (about 40 students) will continue to the camp known as "IPST Camp 1", and an exam is given, and some, usually 25, are selected to "IPST Camp 2", finally, only 6 students will compete in the International Mathematical Olympiad.

=== United Kingdom ===
In the UK, selection is through competitions and training camps under the auspices of the United Kingdom Mathematics Trust, starting with the multiple-choice Senior Mathematical Challenge (SMC). The SMC is followed by the British Mathematical Olympiad (BMO), held in two rounds, but candidates who did not take part in the SMC or did not achieve the qualifying score may enter the BMO on payment of an entry fee and so be considered for the IMO team. After the two rounds of the BMO, 24 potential team members, chosen primarily based on BMO results, are invited to a training and selection camp held in Trinity College, Cambridge, during which further examinations are held, allowing the number of potential team members to be reduced to eight or nine. A final camp is subsequently held (which has been at locations including Oxford, London and Cambourne over the past few years), after which six students are chosen as the team and a first reserve is also named. In addition to this formal selection process, there is further training during the year for a squad of potential team members, including the 'Advanced Olympiad Mentoring Scheme', practice exams and an annual training camp in Hungary; information from exams at the Hungary camp may be considered in selection where available.

=== United States ===
In the United States, the team is selected through a year-long process, starting with the American Mathematics Competitions (AMC) consisting of 25 multiple-choice questions in 75 minutes with increasing difficulty, with high-scoring individuals from the Year 10 (AMC10) and 12 (AMC12) divisions admitted into the American Invitational Mathematics Examination (AIME). The AIME is invite-only and may also accept proficient takers from the United States of America Mathematical Talent Search.

The AIME includes 15 numerically answered questions in 3 hours, with top scorers qualified for the United States of America Mathematical Olympiad, selecting attendees for the United States Mathematical Olympiad Program, who take the TSTST (Team Selection Test Selection Test) to be eligible to take the final Team Selection Test to select the IMO team.

=== Vietnam ===
In Vietnam, the Mathematics division of the National Scholastic Competition (HSGQG), a yearly competition for Vietnamese high school students is used as basis for IMO team selection. In HSGQG, different aspects of solving mathematical problems are studied and revealed: combinatorics, logics, structural arrangement and proofs. The Math division of the HSGQG is colloquially called the Vietnam Mathematical Olympiad (VMO). After VMO, the top 48 scorers, plus past IMO contestants who have not graduated from high school will participate in the international Olympiads selection tests, commonly called TST. Six students with the highest scores on this test will be the competitors for IMO, whom are exempt from the university entrance examination to prepare for the IMO. The same process is used for the selection of contestants for IPhO, IChO, IBO and IOI, alongside APhO and APIO, with varying numbers of top scorers selected for the TST.

=== Tunisia ===
There are two math associations: ATCCM (Association Tunisienne de Culture et Competitions Mathematique) and ATSM(Association Tunisienne des Sciences Mathematiques) . Each one has its own tests and have the right to choose 3 competitors for IMO, until 2019: they chose together 6 competitors. The arrangement changed this May.
