= Hong Kong Mathematical High Achievers Selection Contest =

Hong Kong Mathematical High Achievers Selection Contest (HKMHASC, Traditional Chinese: 香港青少年數學精英選拔賽) is a yearly mathematics competition for students of or below Secondary 3 in Hong Kong. It is jointly organized by Po Leung Kuk and Hong Kong Association of Science and Mathematics Education since the academic year 1998-1999. Recently, there are more than 250 secondary schools participating.

== Format and Scoring ==
Each participating school may send at most 5 students into the contest. There is one paper, divided into Part A and Part B, with two hours given. Part A is usually made up of 14 - 18 easier questions, carrying one mark each. In Part A, only answers are required. Part B is usually made up of 2 - 4 problems with different difficulties, and may carry different number of marks, varying from 4 to 8. In Part B, workings are required and marked. No calculators or calculation assisting equipments (e.g. printed mathematical tables) are allowed.

== Awards and Further Training ==
Awards are given according to the total mark. The top 40 contestants are given the First Honour Award (一等獎), the next 80 the Second Honour Award (二等獎), and the Third Honour Award (三等獎) for the next 120. Moreover, the top 4 can obtain an award, namely the Champion and the 1st, 2nd and 3rd Runner-up.

Group Awards are given to schools, according to the sum of marks of the 3 contestants with highest mark. The first 4 are given the honour of Champion and 1st, 2nd and 3rd Runner-up. The honour of Top 10 (首十名最佳成績) is given to the 5th-10th, and Group Merit Award (團體優異獎) is given to the next 10.

First Honour Award achievers would receive further training. Eight students with best performance will be chosen to participate in the Invitational World Youth Mathematics Inter-City Competition (IWYMIC).

== List of Past Champions (1999-2026) ==
- 98-99: Queen Elizabeth School, Ying Wa College
- 99-00: Queen's College
- 00-01: La Salle College
- 01-02: St. Paul's College
- 02-03: Queen's College
- 03-04: La Salle College
- 04-05: La Salle College
- 05-06: La Salle College
- 06-07: La Salle College
- 07-08: La Salle College
- 08-09: Diocesan Boys' School
- 09-10: St. Paul's Co-educational College
- 10-11: La Salle College
- 11-12: La Salle College
- 12-13: Queen Elizabeth School
- 13-14: Po Leung Kuk Centenary Li Shiu Chung Memorial College
- 14-15: Queen's College
- 15-16: Pui Ching Middle School
- 16-17: La Salle College
- 17-18: Queen's College
- 18-19: La Salle College
- 22-23: Diocesan Boys' School
- 23-24: Diocesan Boys' School
- 24-25: Diocesan Boys’ School
- 25-26: Diocesan Boys’ School

=== Performance by school ===
School	Winners	Seasons won
La Salle College	10	2000-01, 2003-04, 2004-05, 2005-06, 2006-07, 2007-08, 2010-11, 2011-12, 2016-17, 2018–19
Diocesan Boys' School	5	2008-09, 2022-23, 2023-24, 2024-25, 2025-26
Queen's College	4	1999-00, 2002-03, 2014–15, 2017-18
Queen Elizabeth School	2	1998-99, 2012-13
Po Leung Kuk Centenary Li Shiu Chung Memorial College	2	2013-14
Pui Ching Middle School	1	2015-16
St. Paul's College	1	2001-02
St. Paul's Co-educational College	1	2009-10
Ying Wa College	1	1998-99

== See also ==
- List of mathematics competitions
- Hong Kong Mathematics Olympiad
- Invitational World Youth Mathematics Inter-City Competition
- Education in Hong Kong
- Po Leung Kuk
- Hong Kong Association of Science and Mathematics Education
