= Olimpíada de Matemática do Grande ABC =

Brazilian mathematics competition

The Olimpíada de Matemática do Grande ABC (English:Grande ABC Mathematical Olympiad), or OMABC is a mathematical competition for pre-collegiate Brazilian students of Grande ABC region, composed by the following cities:

- Santo André
- São Caetano do Sul
- São Bernardo do Campo
- Diadema
- Mauá
- Ribeirão Pires
- Rio Grande da Serra

The Faculdade de Ciências Exatas e Tecnológicas da Universidade Metodista de São Paulo is the main organizer of this event, who create the tests and correct then. The main purpose of this olympiad is improve the mathematical knowledge, encouraging the study and research in scientific areas., and contributing to participate in national mathematical competitions, like Olimpíada Brasileira de Matemática das Escolas Públicas and Olimpíada Brasileira de Matemática. The first edition was held in 2004.

== Awards ==
=== Students ===
The participants are ranked based on their individual scores. Medals are awarded to the highest ranked participants, such that slightly less than half of them receive a medal. Subsequently, the cutoffs (minimum scores required to receive a gold, silver or bronze medal respectively) are chosen such that the ratio of gold to silver to bronze medals awarded approximates 1 : 2 : 3.

- Gold medal
- Silver medal
- Bronze medal

=== Schools ===
Special prizes are awarded for the schools:

- Trophy: For the schools whose students received at least a golden medal.
- Honorable Mention: For the schools at least one student received an award.

== Champions of OMABC ==
Edition	Year	Champion
Edition	Year	Level 1	Level 2	Level 3	Level 4
1	2004; Details	Paula Baranauskas Dutra Silva	Gustavo Martella Achkar	Natália Mitiko Aono
2	2005; Details	Thiago Tobal Furtado	Gabriel Moreira Francisco	Alexandre Soares Cavalcante	Sara Amaral Taira
3	2006; Details	Danilo Seixas de Souza	Cauê Felipe Brighenti Pan	Abel Medina Lourenço	Leandro de Araujo Carvalho
4	2007; Details	Ana Beatrice Bonganha Zanon	Guilherme da Rocha Dahrug	Tayran Milá Mendes Olegário	Abel Medina Lourenço
5	2008; Details	Bruno Soiti Kamimura Marino	André Amaral de Sousa	Guilherme da Rocha Dahrug	André Daher de Moura
6	2009; Details	João Álvaro Nogueira Nunes	Bruna Favoretto	Guilherme da Rocha Dahrug	João Fernando Doriguello Diniz
7	2010; Details	Amanda Tamkevicius Fernandes	Nicolas Seoane Miquelin	Danilo Moreira Simões	Guilherme da Rocha Dahrug
8	2011; Details	Hélcio Prado de Lima	Gabriella de Souza Costa	Nicolas Seoane Miquelin	Rafael Ferreira Antonioli
9	2012; Details	Hélcio Prado de Lima	Douglas de Araujo Smigly	Nicolas Seoane Miquelin	Ana Beatrice Bonganha Zanon
10	2013; Details	Leonardo Fabrício Gerlach	Beatriz Marques de Brito	Lucas Vinícius Terani	Gustavo Hideki Yamada
11	2014; Details	Vitória Torres Nunes	Júlio César Tibério de Araújo	Douglas de Araujo Smigly	Iago Martinelli Lopes
12	2015; Details	Beatriz Maciel Ballarin	Thiago Mendes Pinheiro	Gabriel Magalhães Cervi	Douglas de Araujo Smigly
13	2016; Details	Pedro Pinheiro Mezadre	Alessandro da Cunha Menegon	Jonathan Pereira Maria	Julian Drumov Gonçalves Simioni
14	2017; Details

=== Schools awarded with trophies ===
Edition	Year	Schools awarded with trophies
1	2004; Details	Colégio Ábaco; Colégio Gradual; Colégio Eduardo Gomes Colégio Liceu Jardim (Note: The Colégio Unidade Jardim changes his name to Colégio Liceu Jardim in 2015.); EE Wallace Cockrane Simonsen; Educandário Santo Antônio
2	2005; Details	Educandário Santo Antônio; Colégio Harmonia; Colégio Ábaco; Colégio Eduardo Gomes; Colégio Liceu Jardim Colégio Brasília; Colégio Metodista; Colégio Termomecanica; Centro Educacional Objetivo (Note: O Centro Educacional Objetivo possui várias unidades na região do Grande ABC.)
3	2006; Details	Colégio Harmonia; Centro Educacional Objetivo; Colégio Arbos Colégio Brasília; ETE Jorge Street; Centro Educacional Objetivo
4	2007; Details	Colégio Liceu Jardim; Centro Educacional Interação Centro Educacional Objetivo; Colégio Etapa
5	2008; Details	Centro Educacional Objetivo; Externato Santo Antônio; Colégio Barão de Mauá EE Augusto de Oliveira Jordão; Colégio Liceu Jardim
6	2009; Details	Colégio Barão de Mauá Colégio Liceu Jardim
7	2010; Details	Centro Educacional Objetivo; Colégio Barão de Mauá; Colégio Eduardo Gomes Colégio Liceu Jardim; Colégio Petrópolis; ETE Júlio de Mesquita
8	2011; Details	Colégio Eduardo Gomes; Colégio Liceu Jardim Colégio Singular
9	2012; Details	EMEF Leandro Klein; Colégio Eduardo Gomes; Colégio Liceu Jardim Colégio Singular; EMEF Cecília Meireles
10	2013; Details	EMEF Professor Rosalvito Cobra; Colégio Eduardo Gomes; Colégio Metodista; Colégio Liceu Jardim Colégio Ábaco; Externato Santo Antônio; Centro Educacional Objetivo - Unidade Frei Gaspar
11	2014; Details	EMEF Professor Rosalvito Cobra; Colégio Liceu Jardim Colégio Termomecanica
12	2015; Details	Colégio Termomecanica; Colégio Liceu Jardim Colégio Eduardo Gomes; Colégio Petrópolis
13	2016; Details
