= Nikolay Konstantinov =

Russian mathematician (1932–2021)

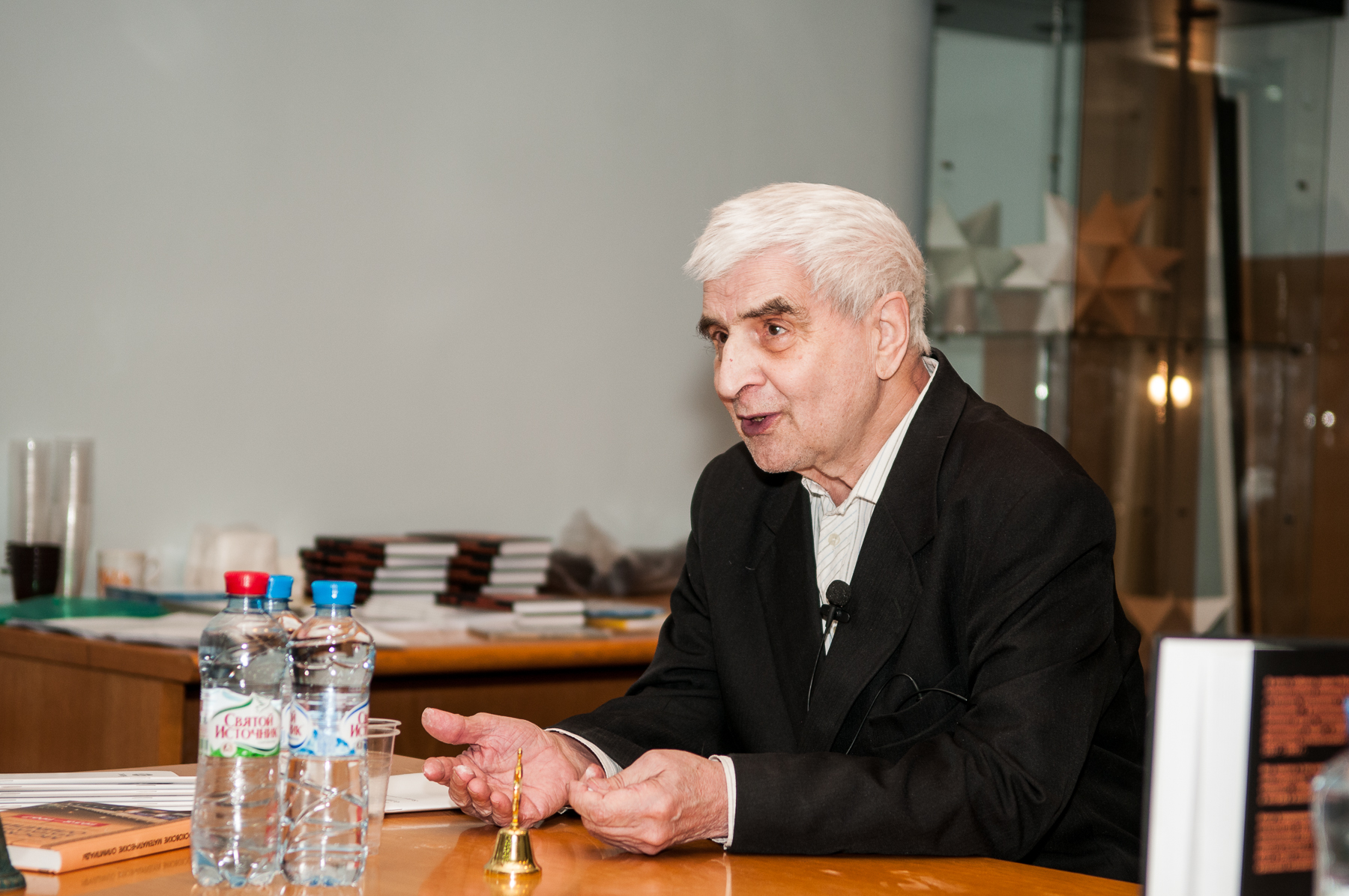
Nikolay Konstantinov

Nikolay Nikolayevich Konstantinov (Russian: Николай Николаевич Константинов; 2 January 1932 – 3 July 2021) was a leading Soviet and Russian mathematical educator and organizer of numerous mathematics competitions for high school students. He is best known as the creator of the system of math schools and math classes and as the creator and chief organizer of the Tournament of the Towns. For his work he was awarded the Paul Erdős award in 1992.

== Biography ==
Konstantinov was born and grew up in Moscow, Soviet Union. He graduated from the Physics Department of the Moscow State University in 1954, and later received a Ph.D. in physics.

In the 1950s, he started a math circle in Moscow University and since the 1960s in a number of Moscow high schools. He continued working with schools developing special classes with mathematics concentration and individual approach to learning. His students went on to win mathematics competitions on all levels and dozens of them became well-known mathematicians.

In 1978, Konstantinov started the Lomonosov tournament, a multi-subject science competition. This tournament is continued every year since then. In 1980, he started the international Tournament of the Towns which is now organized in over 150 towns in 25 countries.

Until his late 80s, Konstantinov continued working in Moscow High School 179 and was an editor of Kvant magazine, a popular Russian science publication.

In 1990, Konstantinov was one of the founders of Independent University of Moscow, one of the leading institutions of higher learning in mathematics in Russia.

Konstantinov died from the effects of COVID-19 on 3 July 2021, during the COVID-19 pandemic in Russia. He was 89 years old.

== Books ==
- Gelfand, S.I.; Konstantinov, N.N.; Kirillov, A.A.; Gerver, M.L.; Kushnirenko, A.G. (1969). Sequences and combinatorial problems.(The Pocket Mathematical Library. Workbook 1). New York-London-Paris: Gordon and Breach Science Publishers. p. 85. Zbl 0177.30403.
- Gelfand, Sergei Izrailevich; Gerver, M.L.; Kririllov, A.A.; Konstantinov, N.N.; Kushnirenko, A.G. (2002). Sequences, combinations, limits. Translated and adapted from the Russian by Leslie Cohn and Joan Teller. Reprint of the 1969 ed. Mineola, NY: Dover Publications. p. 142. Zbl 1011.40001.
- Gelfand, S.I.; Gerver, M.L.; Kirillov, A.A.; Konstantinov, N.N.; Kushnirenko, A.G. (1965). Aufgaben zur Elementarmathematik. Folgen. Kombinarorik. Grenzwerte (in Russian). Moskau: Verlag 'Nauka'. Hauptredaktion für physikalisch-mathematische Literatur. p. 176. Zbl 0148.02902.

== Scholarly publications ==
- Konstantinov, N.N.; Tabov, J.B.; Taylor, P.J. (1991). "Birth of the Tournament of Towns". Mathematics Competitions. 4 (2): 28–41.
- Konstantinov, N.N.; Vasilev, N.B.; Tolpygo, A.K. (1991). "Twelve tournaments". Russian Informational Center of International Mathematical Tournament of Towns Moskow.
- Константинов, Н. Н.; Семенов, А. Л. (7 April 2021). "Результативное образование в математической школе". Чебышёвский Сборник (in Russian). 22 (1): 413–446. doi:10.22405/2226-8383-2021-22-1-413-446. ISSN 2226-8383. S2CID 243609047.
