= KMS =

KMS may refer to:

== Organizations ==
- Keenie Meenie Services, private military contractor
- Korean Mathematical Society
- National Survey and Cadastre of Denmark (Kort & Matrikelstyrelsen), former name of the Danish Geodata Agency
- Kosovar Mathematical Society

== Science and technology ==
- Kabuki makeup syndrome, a congenital disorder
- Kasabach–Merritt syndrome, a disease involving a vascular tumor
- KMS state (Kubo–Martin–Schwinger), in quantum thermodynamics

=== Computing ===
- Kernel mode-setting, of computer display
  - KMS driver, Linux kernel device driver
- KMS (hypertext), the Knowledge Management System hypertext system
- Key Management Service, a Microsoft technology
- Key management system, in cryptography

== Other uses ==
- Kumasi Airport (IATA code KMS), Ghana
- KMS, a ship prefix sometimes attributed to vessels of the Kriegsmarine
- Kayla/KMS, aliases for former hacker Ryan Ackroyd

== See also ==
- KMS-4, a North Korean satellite of the Kwangmyŏngsŏng program
