= Chenchang Zhu =

Mathematician

Chenchang Zhu is a mathematician and a tenured W2 professor at the University of Göttingen. She is known for her contributions to differential geometry, Poisson geometry, and the theory of higher structures, particularly higher Lie groupoids and higher algebroids. For 2025, she holds the inaugural CRM-MdM Chair of Excellence at the Centre de Recerca Matemàtica (CRM) in Barcelona. Zhu was a gold medalist at the 1995 International Mathematical Olympiad, achieving a perfect score of 42/42.

== Academic background ==
Chenchang Zhu completed her undergraduate studies at Peking University before pursuing doctoral research at the University of California, Berkeley, where she earned her Ph.D. in 2004 under the mentorship of Alan Weinstein, with a dissertation entitled Integrating Lie Algebroids via Stacks and Applications to Jacobi Manifolds. Following her doctoral studies, she held a postdoctoral position at ETH Zurich from 2004 to 2006. Her professional career continued as a maître de conférences at Grenoble Alpes University between 2006 and 2008. In 2008, she joined the Mathematisches Institut of the University of Göttingen as a Junior Professor, subsequently attaining the rank of tenured W2 professor in 2013. For 2025, she holds the inaugural CRM-María de Maeztu (CRM-MdM) Chair of Excellence at the Centre de Recerca Matemàtica in Barcelona, a position awarded to world-leading women mathematicians whose work aligns with the Centre's strategic research areas in higher category theory and differential geometry.

== Research contributions ==
Zhu's research program focuses on the interplay between higher structures in differential geometry and mathematical physics, with particular emphasis on the differentiation and integration in Lie theory of higher Lie algebroids, and higher Lie groupoids and their connections to homotopy theory. She is noted for introducing Kan simplicial manifolds in 2006, which provide a calculable model for ∞-stacks and have become a foundational tool in the study of higher differential geometry. Her work on Lie's Third Theorem for Lie algebroids utilized the theory of stacky Lie groupoids to integrate Lie algebroid morphisms, successfully providing a resolution to classical non-integrability problems that had previously limited the scope of the theory. In 2020, with Chris Rogers, she co-published work on the homotopy theory for Lie ∞-groupoids, founding the concept of incomplete category of fiberant objects (iCFO), which provides an ∞-category for Lie ∞-groupoids. This line of inquiry has been extended in her 2023 work in Advances in Mathematics on shifted symplectic higher Lie groupoids, which extends the scope of classical symplectic structure to modern higher differential geometry.

In addition to her work on groupoids, Zhu has explored the cohomology and homotopy theory of embedding tensors and Lie-Leibniz triples, as detailed in a 2021 publication in Communications in Mathematical Physics. Her 2011 work on higher extensions of Lie algebroids by representation up to homotopy provides an integration of Courant algebroids. In interdisciplinary collaborations, she has applied higher geometric structures to topological orders, notably in the study of generalized symmetries in nonlinear sigma models. Her 2024 preprint Duals of Higher Vector Spaces, co-authored with Stefano Ronchi, further explores the intersection of differential geometry, algebraic topology, and category theory.

Currently, her work on the differentiation of L ∞-groupoids, co-authored with Du Li, Leonid Ryvkin, and Arne Wessel, demonstrates that the presheaf of graded manifolds obtained via the differential-geometric fat point is representable by the tangent complex of the n-groupoid, further bridging the gap between higher groupoids and graded geometry.

== Awards and recognition ==
- Inaugural CRM-María de Maeztu Chair of Excellence (2025).
- IMO Gold Medal (1995, Perfect Score).

== Service and mentorship ==
Zhu is the Gleichstellungsbeauftragte (Equal Opportunities Officer) for the Mathematisches Institut at Göttingen and an organizer of WiMgo! (Women in Math Göttingen), which promotes gender equality in mathematics. She has supervised several PhD graduates, including Malte Dehling (2020), whose dissertation was entitled Symmetric Homotopy Theory for Operads and Weak Lie 3-Algebras, Du Li (2014), whose dissertation was entitled Higher Groupoid Actions, Bibundles, and Differentiation, Stefano Ronchi (2025), whose dissertation was entitled Duals of higher vector bundles and cotangents of Lie 2-groupoids, and Hao Xu (2025), whose dissertation was entitled On Étale Algebras and Fusion 2-Categories. Under her mentorship, the Göttingen team achieved a No. 6 global ranking in the International Mathematics Competition for University Students (IMC) in 2016. In 2023, she coached Male Hesse to become the first female participant from Göttingen to win a Grand First Prize at the IMC.

== Personal life ==
Zhu's aptitude for mathematics was recognized at age 10 when she achieved a perfect score on a school test, leading to her enrollment in specialized gifted education. In 1993, motivated by the passing of Hong Kong rock singer Wong Ka Kui of the band Beyond, she dedicated herself to qualifying for the 1994 and 1995 International Mathematical Olympiads, completing the high school mathematics curriculum in a single summer for this purpose. She has described her approach to research as "balancing Yin and Yang" in mathematical structures, reflecting a philosophy of seeking harmony between abstract theory and concrete application.
