= Marian P. Roque =

Filipina mathematician

Marian Roque
- Occupation: Mathematician
- Known for: former president of the Mathematical Society of the Philippines

Academic background
- Education: University of the Philippines Diliman; University of Essen; Waseda University
- Alma mater: University of the Philippines Diliman

Marian P. Roque is a Filipina mathematician. She was the president of the Mathematical Society of the Philippines, a professor in the Institute of Mathematics of the University of the Philippines Diliman, and former Director of the Institute of Mathematics. Her mathematical specialty is the theory of partial differential equations.

Roque's interest in a career in Mathematics began in her grade school participation in the first National Quiz Bee. She continued her studies in mathematics at the University of the Philippines Diliman, where she earned her bachelor's (1986), master's (1989), and doctoral degrees (1996). Through the Sandwich Scholarship Program, she did her research work for her dissertation at the University of Essen, where she studied under Bernd Schultze. While studying in Germany, she faced discrimination due to her gender and nationality. She then completed a postdoctoral fellowship at Waseda University.

With Doina Cioranescu and Patrizia Donato, she is the author of An Introduction to Second Order Partial Differential Equations: Classical and Variational Solutions (World Scientific, 2018).

== Awards ==
- 2012: Gawad Tsanselor para sa Natatanging Guro
- 2014-2016: UP Scientist
- 2016: National Research Council of the Philippines Outstanding Achievement Award.
