= Olympiade Mathématique Belge =

The Olympiade Mathématique Belge (English: Belgian Mathematical Olympiad; OMB) is a mathematical competition for students in grades 7 to 12, organised each year since 1976. Only students from the French community participate, Dutch-speaking students can compete in the Vlaamse Wiskunde Olympiade.

The competition is split up into three age categories:

- Mini-Olympiade for grades 7 and 8
- Midi-Olympiade for grades 9 and 10
- Maxi-Olympiade for grades 11 and 12

Among the participants, three are selected to represent Belgium in the International Mathematical Olympiad, together with three students selected through the Vlaamse Wiskunde Olympiade.

These three participants were chosen through a series of contests. The first round is the « éliminatoire » in which anyone who is eligible to participate in their own category can. Out of these students, about 10% of the highest-scoring ones are selected to participate in the « demi-finale ». In this round, a similar multiple-choice test (almost identical in layout to the first round) is given to the contestants. Out of the top scorers from this round, participants are invited to take part in the « finale ». In this final test, 4 or 5 questions are given (instead of 30), and the answers and reasoning must be thoroughly explained. Finally, some promising students, from this final test, are then picked to attend a maths camp at which the 3 imo team members shall be selected.
