= Championnat International de Jeux Mathématiques et Logiques =

International mathematics competition

The Championnat International des Jeux Mathématiques et Logiques (lit. 'International Competition for Mathematical and Logical Games') is an international mathematics competition mainly for French-speaking countries, but participation is not limited by language.

== History ==
This competition was created in 1987 and was called Championnat de France des jeux mathématiques et logiques (French competition for mathematical and logical games) at that time. Contestants could come from other countries, but the competition was entirely in French. It became Championnat International des Jeux Mathématiques et Logiques at its fourth edition (1990), but was still in French. Then it became more and more international, with the problems translated in more and more languages.

Since its beginning, this competition is organized by the French federation Fédération Française des Jeux Mathématiques (FFJM). But as it became international, federations were created in other countries and they take part in the organization.

The final of the first edition in 1987 took place in Parthenay. From its second edition in 1988 to the 33rd in 2019, the final took place in Paris or its suburbs. At the final of the 33rd edition, it was announced that the next final would be in Lausanne. However, the 34th edition was eventually canceled due to the COVID-19 pandemic and replaced by an online competition "for the pleasure". The final of the 35th edition is still planned to be in Lausanne.

== See also ==
- List of mathematics competitions
