= Icelandic Junior College Mathematics Competition =

Math Olympiad in Iceland

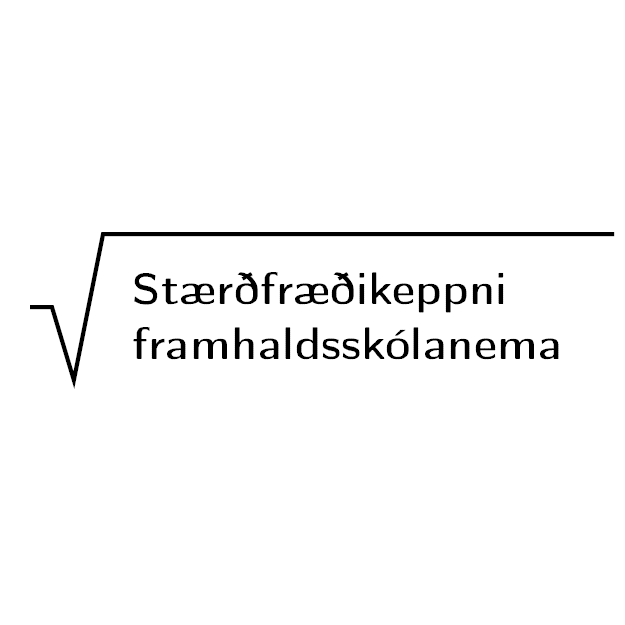
The logo of Stærðfræðikeppni Framhaldsskólanema.

Icelandic Junior College Mathematics Competition (Stærðfræðikeppni framhaldsskólanema) is an annual mathematical olympiad first held in the winter of 1984–1985. It is hosted by the Icelandic Mathematical Organization (Íslenska stærðfræðafélagið) and the Natural Sciences's Teacher Association, and the largest competition of its kind in the country. Its goals include increasing the interest of Icelandic secondary school students towards mathematics, and other fields built on a mathematical foundation.

The contest is held in two parts every winter. First, a qualifier held in October of every year on two difficulty levels; upper level, and lower level. The lower level is intended for first year secondary school students, and the upper level for older students. Those who do well in the qualifier are invited to the final competition, held in March.

Alongside honours and awards, the top students are selected to perform in various mathematical olympiads, including the Baltic Way, the Nordic Mathematical Contest, and the International Mathematical Olympiad.
