= VWO =

VWO may refer to:

- Vlaamse Wiskunde Olympiade, a Flemish mathematics competition
- Voorbereidend wetenschappelijk onderwijs, a Dutch school system
- Voluntary welfare organisation, charitable organisation
- Visual Website Optimizer, an A/B testing tool for online experimentation and conversion rate optimization
