= Hkmo =

HKMO may refer to:

- Hong Kong Mathematics Olympiad
- ICAO-Code for Mombasa Moi International Airport
