= Nordic Mathematical Contest =

School mathematics competition

The Nordic Mathematical Contest (NMC) is a mathematics competition for secondary school students from the five Nordic countries: Denmark, Finland, Iceland, Norway and Sweden. It takes place every year in March or April and serves the double purpose of being a regional secondary school level mathematics competition for the Nordic region and a step in the process of selection of the teams of the participating countries for the International Mathematical Olympiad (IMO) and the regional Baltic Way competition.

== Participation ==
At most twenty participants from each country are appointed by the organisers of the national secondary school level mathematics competitions. They must either be eligible to the IMO or attend a secondary school. (The foreword of ref. renders the eligibility requirements unlike the past and present regulations.)

== Problems ==
The exam consists of four problems to be answered in four hours. Only writing and drawing tools are permitted. For each problem the contestant can get from zero to seven points. The problems are of the IMO type and harder than those of the national secondary school level competitions in mathematics of the Nordic countries but not as hard as those of the IMO. They are chosen by the organising committee of the host country of the year from proposals submitted by the national organising committees.

The official web site of the NMC provides a complete collection in English with solutions of the problems from all the years. It is compiled by Matti Lehtinen. Selected versions of the problems in other Nordic languages are also available at the site

== Organisation ==
The NMC is run in a decentralised manner involving no travel of the contestants nor any other personnel. The contestants write the exam in their own schools on the same day. Thence the papers are sent to a committee in the contestants' country who mark them preliminarily. They are then forwarded with the preliminary marking to a committee in the host country of the year, who coordinate the marking and decide the final result of each contestant. Hosting the NMC rotates among the participating countries in a fixed order. In each country, the NMC is run by the organisers of the country's secondary school level mathematics competition.

== History ==
=== Start ===
The early history of the NMC is documented in a series of reports in the journal Normat. According to Åke Samuelsson, the NMC was founded at a meeting of the leaders of the Nordic teams at the 27th IMO in Warsaw 1986. As Denmark did not participate in the IMO before 1991, no team leader from Denmark was there. The founding countries were Finland, Iceland, Norway and Sweden. The first NMC took place on 30 March 1987 hosted by Sweden with 47 contestants from the four participating countries. It is stressed in the report that the organisation was minimal. The 2nd, 3rd and 4th NMCs took place in 1988-90 hosted by Norway, Iceland and Finland, respectively. This established the hosting order for the future.

Rumors of this new mathematics competition reached Denmark, and in 1989 a single Danish student, who was very eager to participate, was allowed to write the exam in a school in Sweden. In 1990 more Danish students participated, so Matti Lehtinen could write in his report: "For the first time the NMO may now be called a common Nordic competition since all five Nordic countries participated with at least half a dozen pupils." (Translated from Swedish; the abbreviation NMO is elucidated in the section Name below.) Denmark was invited to host the NMC in 1991, the year Denmark entered the IMO, but since the Danish organisers were inexperienced, the Swedish organisers agreed to host the NMC for a second time. Denmark would then host the NMC in 1992 and again in 1996. In the future, the hosting order would be the present one: Sweden, Norway, Iceland, Finland, Denmark.

Slightly diverging views of the aim of the NMC among its founders are indicated in the reports. According to Åke Samuelsson's report from the 1st NMC, the participants in the founding meeting discussed "the possibility of arranging a Nordic mathematics competition which in difficulty would lie somewhere between the national competitions and the International Mathematical Olympiad" (translated from Swedish). This suggests that they wanted NMC to be a regional mathematics competition in its own right at a level accessible for Nordic secondary school students. In Matti Lehtinen's report from the 4th NMC the NMC is seen rather as a vehicle for the training for the IMO: "Most of the participants were candidates for the International Mathematical Olympiad (IMO), and the NMO may be seen at all as a link in the training for the IMO." (Translated from Swedish.) The latter view is expressed in the foreword of ref. as well.

=== Name ===
Regulations 1991

The name of the competition has changed over time. Originally it was called 'The Nordic Mathematics Olympiad' (Swedish: Den nordiska matematikolympiaden). The 1991 regulations (see image) display the present name, 'The Nordic Mathematical Contest', and words equivalent in Scandinavian languages to 'competition' or 'contest' are used in the subsequent reports except in 1999, when 'olympiad' returns temporarily. The following remark in ref. seems to reflect some discussion of the name in the early days; the word 'olympiad' may have been felt too pretentious: "The Fourth Nordic Mathematics Olympiad [Swedish: matematikolympiaden], or maybe more descriptively—Mathematics Competition [Swedish: matematiktävlingen] took place on 5 April 1990." (Translated from Swedish.) In ref. the NMC is called 'The Nordic Mathematical Competition'.

=== Regulations ===
The first documented regulations of the NMC were issued for the 5th NMC in 1991. (See image.) They were applied unaltered in 1992 and apparently with at most minor changes in the following years. According to these regulations students in a 'gymnasium' (10th–12th school year in the educational systems of the Nordic countries, in the regulations referred to as the 'upper school') are eligible to participate without any age limit. The curriculum comprises "any branch of mathematics suitable for upper school students", and it is stressed that it is thus broader than that of the IMO. In particular, "problems from calculus and elementary probability theory" may occur. The subjects of most of the problems that have been posed at the NMC actually lie within the traditional IMO curriculum. However, problem 4 in 2002 must be deemed outside this curriculum since its formulation involves the concept of probability. No aim of the NMC is specified in the 1991 regulations.

Regulations issued for the 11th NMC in 1997 are very similar to those of 1991, the most conspicuous difference being that the host country is now allowed to propose problems. According to the 1991 regulations, proposals should be collected from the countries other than the host country. It is not known at which of the NMCs 1993–97 this change was first implemented.

The 1997 regulations seem to have been acknowledged until 1999. In fact, in this year, at a meeting of the leaders of the Nordic teams during the IMO, the leader of the Norwegian team raised the issue that the 1997 regulations prevented the participation of talented students who were too young to be in a 'gymnasium'. As a repair he proposed to change in point 4 of the regulations the words "enrolled in an upper school (gymnasium)" to "enrolled in an upper school (gymnasium) or eligible to the IMO". The meeting consented to the proposal.

The decision of the Nordic team leaders at the 40th IMO in 1999 was never implemented in the context of the NMC, but its rule of eligibility was adopted for the Baltic Way competition in 2000 hosted by Norway and except for a minor change of wording it remains the basic rule of eligibility of this competition. In 2000, 2001, 2005 and 2006, the hosts of the NMC issued a statement whose version from 2005 is cited below. According to this statement, the eligibility to the IMO is the main criterion for the eligibility to the NMC. It is accepted, however, that this criterion may not be fulfilled in "some borderline cases". About the problems it is stated only that they should be "slightly below the IMO level". The marking scale is specified according to the tradition. The full text of the statement reads as follows in its version from 2005:

"We shall not publish a detailed regulation, but just remind everybody of the basic facts:

- Each country can enroll a maximum of 20 participants
- Participants should be eligible for the next IMO (there is [a] possibility of some borderline cases, where the IMO elig[i]bility is no[t] fulfilled, perhaps because of age, as we have noticed some years ago, but we will not make [a] problem of this).
- The contest consist of four problems slightly below the IMO level. All countries are allowed and asked to submit problem proposals, but the final choice of problems is left to the organizing country.
- The organizing country prepares the exam reasonably early so that the participating counties can make their translations in good time. The organizing country checks the translations before the contest.
- The contest takes place on March 30, 2005, basically at each participant's own school. The contact persons in the participating countries take care of the local arrangements.
- After the contest, the students' papers are preliminarily marked in the participating countries an[d] sent to the organizing country for a coordination of the marking. The problems are marked on a scale with maximum five points for each problem. The organizing country provides guidelines for marking. The coordination ends ultimo April[.]
- The organizing country provides the final result sheet and diplomas, if possible before the end of the school year."

After a mail conference in 2009 among the organisations of the national mathematics competitions, regulations were issued again for the competition in 2010 and have since then been applied essentially unaltered. For the first time an aim of the NMC is stated in these regulations: The participants should experience a mathematical contest at an international level, and the NMC should provide information relevant for the selection of the teams for the IMO. The participants should be eligible to the IMO, and also other secondary school students are allowed to participate. The mathematical content of the problems is that of the IMO and their intended level of difficulty slightly lower than that of IMO problems. An annual meeting of the Nordic leaders during the IMO, which has taken place traditionally throughout the history of the NMC, is mentioned in the regulations for the first time.
