= Mediterranean Mathematics Competition =

International mathematics competition for school students

The Mediterranean Mathematics Competition (also: Peter O’Halloran Memorial) is a mathematics competition for school students, taking place annually since 1998. All countries bordering the Mediterranean Sea are allowed to participate, as well as, if invited, their neighbouring countries.

== Motto ==
The Mediterranean Competition's goals are:

- Discovery, development and challenge of mathematically gifted students
- Establishment of friendly and cooperative relationships between students and teachers of various mediterranean countries
- Creation of a possibility for international exchange about school practices
- Support for the engagement in solving mathematical olympiad problems, as well as the dealing with other mathematical problems, also in non participating countries

== Rules ==
The contest is conducted separately in every country. Each participating country can let an unrestricted number of students write the contest, but only the results of the top ten, according to national evaluation, can be submitted for international ranking. Every of these is awarded a certificate either of participation or merit, whereas the levels of merit - Gold, Silver, Bronze and Honorable Mention – are awarded similarly to the International Mathematical Olympiad. The participants have to be less than 20 years of age and may not have enrolled in a university study or a comparable educative scheme.

== History ==
The Mediterranean Competition initially took place in 1998, created and until today organized by Spanish Francisco Bellot Rosado. In the first year, only three problems were to be solved. However from the second year on, the contest consisted of four problems each, with an overall contest time of four hours.
