= American Mathematical Association of Two-Year Colleges =

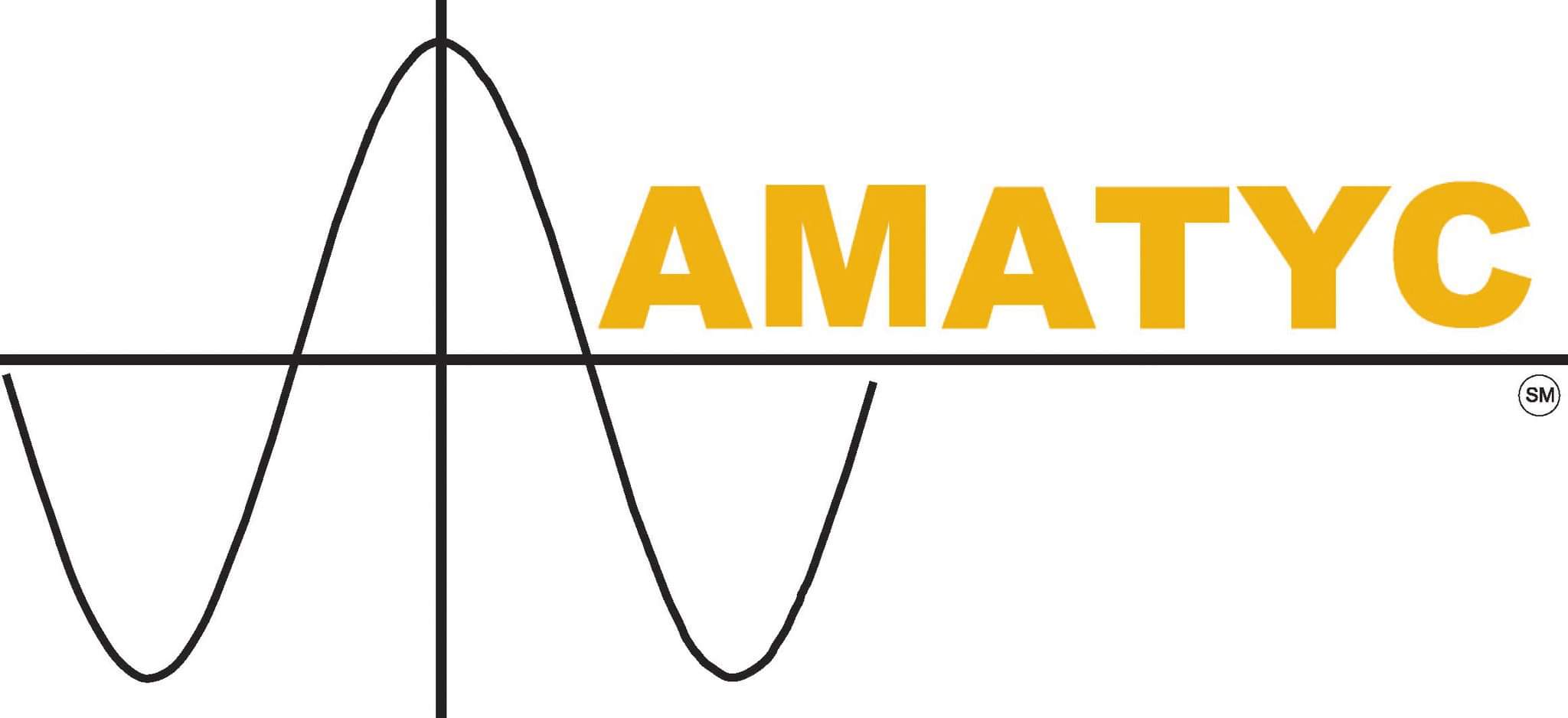
- Formation: 1974
- Headquarters: Memphis, Tennessee
- Members: 2,500
- President: Laura Watkins
- Website: http://www.amatyc.org/

The American Mathematical Association of Two-Year Colleges (AMATYC) is an organization dedicated to the improvement of education in the first two years of college mathematics in the United States and Canada. AMATYC hosts an annual conference, summer institutes, workshops and mentoring for teachers in and outside math, and a semiannual math competition. AMATYC publishes one refereed journal, MathAMATYC Educator, and issues position statements on matters of mathematics education.

The math competition is held in spring and fall semester each year and is limited to problems in precalculus. Only students enrolled in two-year colleges are eligible to participate. Only students who haven't received any degree/diploma, including within or outside of the U.S., can enter the competition.

AMATYC was founded in 1974. Its office is at Southwest Tennessee Community College in Memphis, Tennessee.

AMATYC is divided into eight regions: Central, Mid-Atlantic, Midwest, Northeast, Northwest, Southeast, Southwest, and West. A vice president is assigned to each region.

== See also ==
- Mathematical Association of America
- National Council of Teachers of Mathematics
