= Rocket City Math League =

U.S. student-run mathematics competition

Rocket City Math League (RCML) is a student-run mathematics competition in the United States. Run by students at Virgil I. Grissom High School in Huntsville, Alabama, RCML gets its name from Huntsville's nickname as the "Rocket City". RCML was started in 2001 and has been annually sponsored by the Mu Alpha Theta Math Honor Society. The competition consists of three individual rounds and a team round that was added in 2008. It is divided into five divisions named for NASA programs: Explorer (pre-algebra), Mercury (algebra I), Gemini (geometry), Apollo (algebra II), and Discovery (comprehensive).

== Individual rounds ==
Each of the 3 individual rounds consists of a 10 question test with a 30-minute time limit. Out of the 10 questions, there are four 1-point questions, three 2-point questions, two 3-point questions, and one 4-point question, with the more difficult questions having larger point values. The maximum score on an individual test is 20, and individual tests often contain many interesting space-themed questions.

== Team round ==
The team round is divided into a senior division and a junior division that take separate tests for the team round. It consists of a 15 question test with a 30-minute time limit, in which team members work together to get as many correct answers as possible. Out of the 15 questions, there are five 1-point questions, four 2-point questions, three 3-point questions, two 4-point questions, and one 5-point question, making the maximum score on the team test a 35.

== Sources ==
- https://www.rocketcitymath.org
