= MathChallengers =

MathChallengers is the former Mathcounts in British Columbia, Canada. It is open to all grade 8, 9, and 10 students from British Columbia. The major sponsors are the Association of Professional Engineers and Geoscientists of B.C. (APEGBC), the B.C. Association of Mathematics Teachers (BCAMT), BC Hydro, and IBM Canada.

== Rules ==
The Competition consists of 4 stages. Stages 1 and 2 are individual competitions. Stage 3 is a Team competition. Stage 4 is a one-on-one competition between the top 10 individuals who participated in stages 1 and 2. Math Challengers competitions may consist of the following rounds:

=== Stage 1: "Blitz" ===
Stage 1 consists of one session on a variety of mathematical subjects. Participants will be allowed to work for 40 minutes on 26 questions written on four pages (each correct answer will count as one point). Thus, the maximum number of points available in this stage is: 26.

=== Stage 2: "Bulls-Eye" ===
Stage 2 consists of three sessions on a certain mathematical subject. For each of the sessions, participants will be given 12 minutes to work on the 4 questions on that subject. The total number of questions in Stage 2 is 12 and each correct answer will count as two points. Thus, the maximum number of points available in this stage is: 24.

=== Stage 3: "Co-Op" ===
Stage 3 is a Team competition and it consists of three sessions on a variety of mathematical subjects. Participants will be allowed to work for 36 minutes on 15 questions written on one page (each correct answer will count as two points). Thus, the maximum number of points available in this stage is 30. Scientific calculators are allowed for this stage of the competition. Graphing calculators and programmable calculators are not allowed at all. Devices with wireless communication capabilities are absolutely not allowed.

=== Stage 4: "Face-Off" ===
Stage 4 is a one-to-one buzz-in verbal competition for the top scoring 10 individuals.

There will be a total of 9 match up rounds.

Participants should be provided with ample amounts of scratch paper and pencil for calculating answers.

For each questions the participants will be allowed to work for 45 seconds from the time it appears on the screen.

A participant who wishes to provide an answer must buzz. But, only the first person who buzzes will be called to provide an answer. Any answer without pressing the buzzer will be disqualified. Only ONE answer per participant per question is allowed and he/she must provide the answer in an acceptable format (i.e. simplified to lowest terms) and within 3 seconds after being called upon. The opponent may continue working while an answer is provided and if the answer of the first participant who buzzes is incorrect the opponent may use the remainder of the 45 seconds to buzz and be called to provide an answer. The participant who was called on and provides the correct answer will score one point in the round.

== Scoring and ranking ==
=== Individual Score ===
The maximum possible individual score is 50.

=== Team Score ===
The maximum possible team score is 80. The team score is calculated in the following way: The average of the top 4 entries per team + the score of the team from the Co-op stage of the competition.

The final Team marks of each of the teams will be calculated by taking into account the marks of the best four individual participants out of the five marks of the individuals of that team.

If a team consists of less than 4 individuals, scores of 0 will be used for any individual missing and will be included in the calculation of the team's average (for example if a team has only 3 participants who scored 50, 40, and 30, and if they scored 18 in the Co-op stage, then their final team score will be (50+40+30+0) /4+18=48.

== Awards and Regionals and Provincial Finals ==
The top 3 schools in each of the competitions (only if more than 3 schools participate) will be awarded trophies. The top 3 individuals in each of the competitions (Based on their score before the Face-Off stage) will be awarded trophies. The top 10 individuals (but no more than 5 individuals of the same grade from any one school), or the top 25% of participants, (whichever is less), in each of the competitions will advance to the Face-Off stage and will be awarded medals. All individual final standings are based on the performance in the Blitz and Bull's Eye stages. All schools that were awarded trophies in any of the Regional pools will be invited to participate in the Provincial finals.

Additional awards or prizes will be awarded to the best performers of the Face-Off stage (Provincial only). The top 3 schools participating in any of the Regional pools may be invited to participate in the Provincial finals subject to the rules. At the Provincial finals, the top schools and top individuals will be awarded trophies and/or medals. Some of the top individuals in the grade 8 (and grade 9) competition may be invited to participate in a post season competition or event.

== Past winners ==
=== Team Winners (School Winners) Provincials ===
2026

 I. Grade 8
  1.
  2. 
  3. 

II. Grade 9
  1.Burnaby South Secondary School
  2.St. George's School 
  3.West Vancouver Secondary School

III. Grade 10
  1. Burnaby North Secondary School
  2. 
  3. Eric Hamber Secondary School

2025:

 I. Grade 8
  1. St. George's School
  2. West Vancouver Secondary School
  3. Moscrop Secondary School

II. Grade 9
  1. St. George's School
  2. Moscrop Secondary School
  3. David Thompson Secondary School

III. Grade 10
  1. Port Moody Secondary School
  2. Moscrop Secondary School
  3. University Transition Program

2024:

 I. Grade 8
  1. St. George's School
  2. Fraser Heights Secondary School
  3. University-Hill Secondary School

II. Grade 9
  1. Moscrop Secondary School
  2. Port Moody Secondary School
  3. Heritage Woods Secondary School

III. Grade 10
  1. University Transition Program
  2. Moscrop Secondary School
  3. Burnaby North Secondary School

2007:

I. Grade 8 (Score out of 70)
 1. Burnaby South Secondary School - 35.25
 2. St. George's School - 34.25
 3. Transition UBC - 32.00
 4. St. Michaels University School - 27.75
 5. Burnaby North Secondary School - 27.50

II. Grade 9 (Score out of 70)
 1. St. George's School - 43.50
 2. University Hill Secondary School - 41.50
 3. Semiahmoo Secondary School - 41.25
 4. Sir Winston Churchill Secondary School - 40.00
 5. (tied) Transition UBC, and Burnaby North Secondary School - 38.25

2006:

I. Grade 8
 1. University Hill Secondary School
 2. Burnaby Mountain Secondary School
 3. Burnaby North Secondary School
 4. Sir Winston Churchill Secondary School

II. Grade 9
 1. University Hill Secondary School
 2. St. George's School
 3. West Vancouver Secondary School
 4. Windermere Secondary School

== See also ==
- List of mathematics competitions
- Reach For The Top
- Mathcounts
