= Math League =

Mathematics competition

Math League is a math competition for elementary, middle, and high school students in the United States, Canada, and other countries. The Math League was founded in 1977 by two high school mathematics teachers, Steven R. Conrad and Daniel Flegler. Math Leagues, Inc. publishes old contests through a series of books entitled Math League Press. The purpose of the Math League Contests is to provide students "an enriching opportunity to participate in an academically-oriented activity" and to let students "gain recognition for mathematical achievement".

Math League runs three contest formats:

- Grades 4-5: 30 multiple-choice questions to solve in 30 minutes, covering arithmetic and basic principles
- Grades 6-8: 35 multiple-choice questions to solve in 30 minutes, covering advanced arithmetic and basic topics in geometry and algebra
- Grades 9-12: Series of 6 contests. Each contest contains 6 short-answer questions to solve in 30 minutes, covering geometry, algebra, trigonometry, and other advanced pre-calculus topics.

Only plain paper, pencil or pen, and a calculator without QWERTY keyboard are allowed.
