= Philippine Math Olympiad =

School mathematics competition in the Philippines

The Philippine Mathematical Olympiad is a secondary school mathematics competition among secondary school students. First held in 1984, the PMO was created as a venue for high school students with interest and talent in mathematics to compete in a very hard contest.

It is the oldest and the most prominent nationwide mathematics competition among secondary school students in the Philippines. It is regarded as the first step to representing their country at the International Mathematical Olympiad (IMO). It has three stages: two regional and one national.

The Mathematical Society of the Philippines (MSP) selects a team from the top 20 PMO national finalists to represent the Philippines at the IMO. The Philippines first participated in the IMO in 1988.

== Winners ==
Some PMO winners include:

- Andres Rico Gonzales III: Highest country rank in 2020
- Albert John Patupat: Highest country rank in 2018
- Farrell Eldrian Wu, a naturalized Filipino, Highest country rank in 2016
  - Incidentally, Farrell graduated in MIT with a perfect GPA.
