= South East Asian Mathematics Competition =

Mathematics competition for Southeast Asian students

- Genre: Mathematics competition
- Frequency: Annual
- Inaugurated: March 2001
- Most recent: 18 November 2023
- Website: https://seamc.asia

The South East Asian Mathematics Competition (SEAMC) is an annual three-day non-profit mathematics competition for Southeast Asian students at different grade levels. It is a qualifying competition for invitation to the World Mathematics Championships.

Teams have participated from China, Thailand, Hong Kong, Malaysia, Singapore, Brunei, Vietnam, Cambodia, and Nepal.

Host venue locations of the SEAMC changes annually. An online version was held due to the COVID-19 pandemic.

== Eligibility ==
- The Senior Competition is open to all students in Grade 12 (Year 13) or younger.
- The Junior Competition is open to all students in Grade 9 (Year 10) or younger.
- The Secondary Competition is open to all students in Grade 7 (Year 8) or younger during the month of the event and
- Primary level for Grade 5 (Year 6) or younger.

== The competition ==
=== History ===
SEAMC is a mathematics collaboration experience for school students located in South or North East Asia to come together for 2-3 days.

SEAMC was conceived of by Steve Warry, who taught at Alice Smith School in Kuala Lumpur. He organised SEAMC in March 2001. He died one week prior to the first competition. Teams competed for the Warry Cup, which is named in Steve's honour.

From 2014, the NEAMC sister event has been organised for students in Northeast Asia. The organizers enlisted the Nanjing International School to host it initially in February 2014 with the help of Malcolm Coad.

In 2017, the SNEAMC family of events became the World Mathematics Championships.

=== Format ===
Each school enters teams of 3 students each. The competition has nine rounds.

All WMC qualifying competitions have:

- 3 days of engagement
- 9 equally weighted rounds
- 6 skills categories for prizes
- The best sum ranking across all 9 rounds win

School teams engage within the Communication skills rounds.

The Collaboration skills rounds (Open, Lightning and Innovation) are in buddy teams of three. The Challenge are skills rounds undertaken as individuals.

Three skills rounds are (subject specific skills and procedures) knowledge based, three are (plan and execute) strategy focused and three depend upon (new and imaginative ideas) creativity.

So each strategy, creative and knowledge skill category is engaged in alone, in school teams and in buddy teams.

Past questions can be found around the web.

In many SEAMC competitions, there are initial icebreaker events.

=== Prizes ===
- All participants receive a transcript of relative attainment in each of the 9 rounds.
- The highest ranked individuals in each category receive medals.
- The highest ranked individuals across all 9 rounds receive medals.
- The best ranked school team across all 9 rounds receive a respectively named Cup (for the SEAMC Junior competition, this is the original Warry Cup).

The better ranked teams across all of the competition venues that year are invited to the ultimate World Mathematics Championships showdown, hosted by Trinity College, University of Melbourne in the following July each year.

== Results ==
=== Past team winners ===
- 2001 - South Island School, Hong Kong, China
- 2002 - Island School, Hong Kong, China
- 2003 - Garden IS, Kuala Lumpur
- 2004 - Island School, Hong Kong, China
- 2005 - Island School, Hong Kong, China
- 2006 - KGV, Hong Kong, China
- 2007 - KGV, Hong Kong, China
- 2008 - UWCSEA Dover, Singapore
- 2009 - German Swiss International School, Hong Kong
- 2010 - British International School, Vietnam (Jaeho Han, Cheewon Oh, Jungmin Kang)
- 2011 - West Island School, Hong Kong
- 2012 - Chinese International School, Hong Kong
- 2013 - Chinese International School, Hong Kong
- 2014 - Hong Kong International School, Hong Kong
- 2015 - Singapore Chinese School, Singapore
- 2016 - British International School Ho Chi Minh City, Vietnam
- 2017 - British School Manila, Philippines (Senior), Singapore American School, Singapore (Junior)
- 2018 - British School Manila, Philippines; Saigon South International School Ho Chi Minh City, Vietnam
- 2019 - British School Manila, Philippines
- 2020 - UWCSEA East, Singapore
- 2025 - Nureshi Ruwithma Hettiarchchi , Sri Lanka - Global Rank 01 -Paper K

=== World Mathematics Championship June 2018 Results ===
Senior Level

- Winner : Julian Yu
- Runner Up : Yan Pui Matthew Ling
- Runner Up : Wye Yew Ho
- Runner Up : Kevin Xin
- Runner Up : Linda Wang

Junior Level

- Winner : Seung Jae Yang
- Runner Up : Arunav Maheshwari
- Runner Up : Jangju Lee
- Runner Up : Ryusuke Suehiro
- Runner Up : Ravi Bahukhandi
- Runner Up : Soumyaditya Choudhuri
- Runner Up : Tanai Chotanaphuti

=== World Mathematics Championship December 2018 Results ===
- Winner : Palis Pisuttisarun
- Runner Up : Ho Wang Tang
- Runner Up : Byung Hoo Park
- Runner Up : Rocco Jiang

=== Past individual winners ===
- 2001 - John Chan, WIS, Hong Kong
- 2002 - Ernest Chia, Garden IS, Kuala Lumpur
- 2003 - Ernest Chia, Garden IS, Kuala Lumpur
- 2004 - Otto Chan, Island School, Hong Kong
- 2005 - Tiffany Lau, Island School, Hong Kong
- 2006 - En Seng Ng, SAS, Singapore
- 2007 - Oliver Huang, KGV, Hong Kong
- 2008 - Dong Wook Chung, UWCSEA, Singapore
- 2009 - Joon Young Lee, ISB, China
- 2010 - Ki Yun Kim, JIS, Indonesia
- 2011 - Alexander Cooke, South Island School, Hong Kong
- 2012 - Charles Meng, Chinese International School, Hong Kong
- 2013 - Joanna Cheng, South Island School, Hong Kong
- 2014 - Tie between Kyung Chan Lee, Garden International School, Kuala Lumpur, and Michael Wu, Hong Kong International School, Hong Kong
- 2015 - Alex Lee, Taipei European School, Taipei
- 2016 - Otto Winata, Sampoerna Academy Medan, Indonesia
- 2017 - Tiffany Ong, British School Manila; Rahul Arya, King George V School
- 2018 - Juhee (Jessie) Hong, Singapore American School, Singapore
- 2019 - Andrew Chang, Singapore American School, Singapore
