= Liga Matemática =

Mathematics competition in Spain

The Liga Matemática is a mathematics competition organized by the National Association of Mathematics Students.

== History ==
The Liga Matemática began at the 2023 National Meeting of Mathematics Students. The match between the Autonomous University and the University of Barcelona was held at the Mathematics Museum of Catalonia. On 23 March 2024, the match between the University of Zaragoza and the University of La Rioja was played in person in Tudela. In April 2024, the in-person match was played between the University of Valencia and the Technical University of Valencia.

On 10 January 2024, Vavel began covering information about the competition.

In the competition, teams of mathematics students from universities throughout Spain participate, such as the University of Valencia, the University of Cantabria, the University of Barcelona, the Autonomous University of Barcelona, the University of Santiago de Compostela, the University of La Rioja, the University of Málaga, among others.

The Final of the Liga Matemática 2023-2024 was held in May 2024. The winning team was the University of Almería.

La final round of the Liga Matemática 2024-2025 was held in Oviedo. The winning team was the University of Valladolid.

== Format ==
The matches consist of 3 mathematical problems and last 90 minutes. Between 3 and 6 players selected by the delegate participate in each match. When a team manages to solve a problem, it must immediately announce it to the referee and send it to him for correction. The correction must be final: it will be considered a goal or an error. Both teams should know the result of the correction, although no details will be provided about the reason for the error, if any. The team that solves all 3 problems first will finalize the score, avoiding a 3–3 tie. For example, if in a match the score is 2-1 and the first team solves the remaining problem, the final result will be 3–1, regardless of whether the second team manages to solve any of the other two problems in the remaining time.
