= Noetic Learning math contest =

National semi-annual problem-solving competition

Noetic Learning Math Contest
- Type: Educational opportunities
- Founded: 2007
- Founder: Li Kelty
- Headquarters: Overland Park, Kansas
- Area served: United States and Canada
- Website: noetic-learning.com

The Noetic Learning math contest is a national biannual problem-solving competition for elementary and middle school students. The contest aims to encourage students' interest in mathematics and develop problem-solving skills. It is open to students in grades 2 through 8. It is held twice a year, in the fall and spring. The competition consists of a 45-minute timed test, comprising 20 math problems.

== History ==
The Noetic Learning math contest was founded in 2007 by Li Kelty. The company is based in Overland Park, Kansas. The contest has grown over the years, with participants from various schools across the United States.

In Spring 2023, more than 35,000 students nationwide participated in the Noetic Learning Math Contest.

== Awards and recognition ==
Students who participate in the Noetic Learning Math Contest can earn the following awards and recognition, based on their performance:

- Team Winner: The top scorer on the team.
- National Honor Roll: Awarded to the top 10% of participants in each grade category.
- Honorable Mention: Awarded to students who score in the top 50% of participants in their grade category.

School teams can earn the following award:

- Team Achievement: The top 10% of teams in each grade.
