= Olimpíada Brasileira de Matemática das Escolas Públicas =

Math contest for Brazilian students

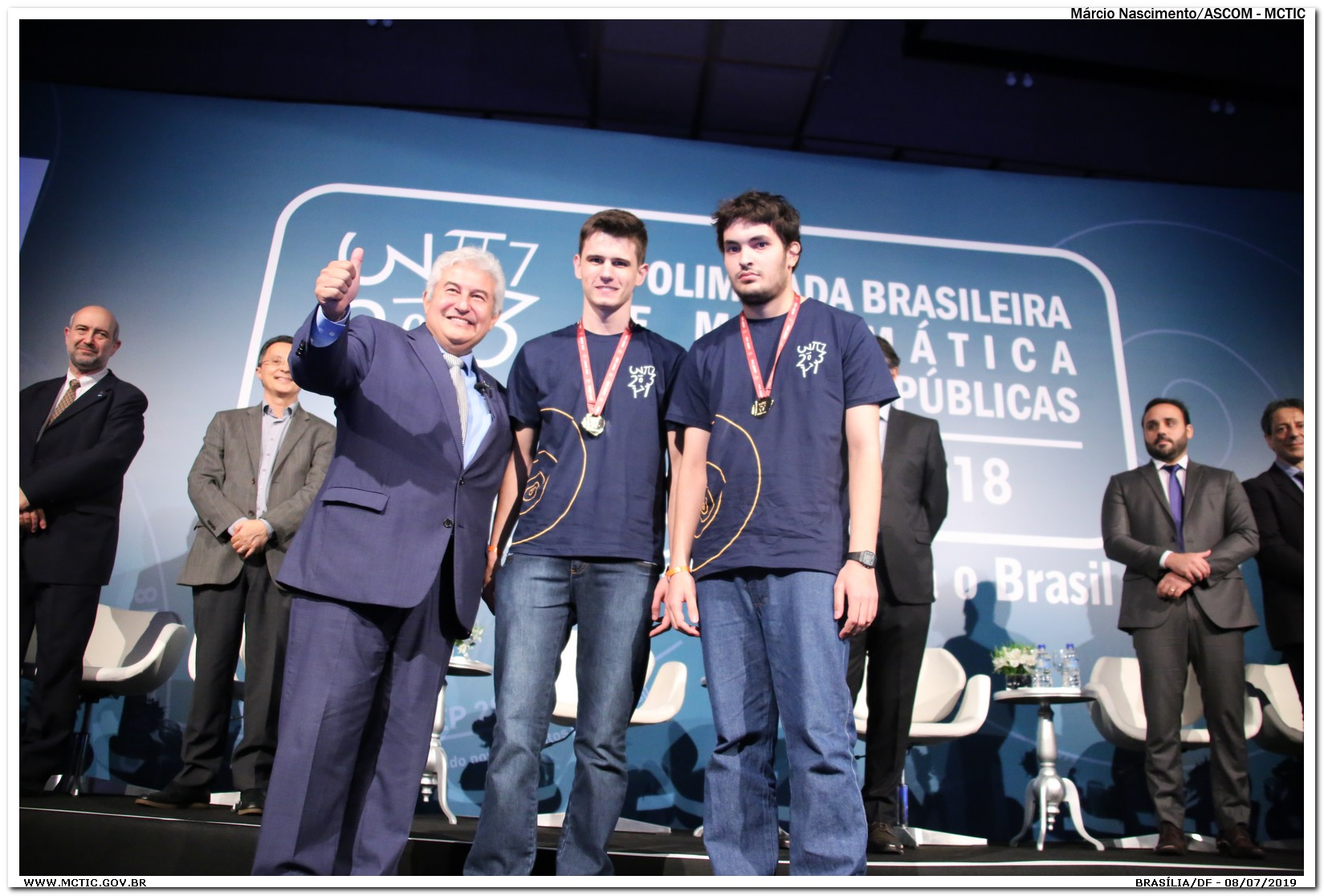
The Brazilian minister of science, technology and innovation Marcos Pontes awards two 2018 OBMEP medalists.

The Brazilian Mathematical Olympiad of Public Schools (Portuguese: Olimpíada Brasileira de Matemática das Escolas Públicas) (OBMEP) is an annual Mathematics contest created in 2005 by the Brazilian Ministério da Ciência e Tecnologia (MCT) and Ministério da Educação (MEC), in collaboration with Instituto Nacional de Matemática Pura e Aplicada (IMPA) and Sociedade Brasileira de Matemática (SBM), to stimulate the mathematics education in Brazil. It is open to public school students from fifth grade to high school. Yearly, around 18 million students are enrolled for its first round.

== See also ==
- Olimpíada Brasileira de Matemática
