= North East Asian Mathematics Competition =

Mathematics competition

The North East Asian Mathematics Competition (NEAMC) is a three-stage mathematics competition in North East Asia.

It is a qualifying competition by Eunoia Ventures for invitation to the Finals of the World Mathematics Championships.

== General information ==
The location of the NEAMC changes annually. There are now at least two venues held annually ).

The Senior level is open to all youths in Grade 12 (Year 13) or below, the Junior level is open to Grade 9 (Year 10) or below, and the Prime Plus level is open to Grade 7 (Year 8) or below.

== The competition ==
=== History ===
NEAMC is a three-day event for school students located in North East Asia,. Participants work alone and in teams, as well as listen to mathematician guest speakers.

NEAMC was organised in February 2014 by Malcolm Coad of Nanjing International School, China. Haese Mathematics are partners of the event since conception

=== Format ===
NEAMC competitions have:

- Three days of engagement
- Six skills categories for prizes
- The best sum ranking across all rounds win

School teams engage within the Communication skills rounds.

The Collaboration skills rounds are in buddy teams of three (teams with random teammates). The Challenge are skills rounds undertaken as individuals.

Three skills rounds are (subject specific skills and procedures) knowledge based, three are (plan and execute) strategy focused and three depend upon (new and imaginative ideas) creativity.

So each strategy, creative and knowledge skill category is engaged in alone, in school teams and in buddy teams.

=== Prizes ===
- All participants receive a transcript of relative attainment in each of the rounds.
- The highest ranked individuals in each category receive medals.
- The highest ranked individuals across all rounds receive medals.
- The best ranked school team across all rounds receive the NEAMC Senior or Junior Cup.

== Results ==
Past team winners

- 2017 – Seoul International School, S Korea
- 2016 – North London Collegiate School Jeju, South Korea
- 2015 – Seoul International School, S Korea
- 2014 – Seoul International School, S Korea

Past individual winners

- 2017 – Booyeon Brian Choi, Seoul International School
- 2016 – Subin Rachael Kim, North London Collegiate School Jeju
- 2015 – Zie Ho Choi, British International School, Pudong
- 2014 – Diana Kim, Seoul International School
