= Hong Kong Association of Science and Mathematics Education =

- Traditional Chinese: 香港數理教育學會
Transcriptions
Yue: Cantonese
- Yale Romanization: Hēung góng sou léih gaau yuhk hohk wúih
- Jyutping: Hoeng1 gong2 sou3 lei5 gaau3 yuk6 hok6 wui5

Hong Kong Association of Science and Mathematics Education is a society to promote and improve the teaching methodology of the science and mathematics in Hong Kong. Founded in 1964, current members are secondary school teachers, professors and lecturers in the universities and government officials in education.
