= Primary Mathematics World Contest =

Mathematics competition in Hong Kong

The Primary Mathematics World Contest (PMWC; traditional Chinese: 保良局小學數學世界邀請賽; simplified Chinese: 保良局小学数学世界邀请赛) is an annual math competition for primary school students in Hong Kong. It was first held in 1997 and is sponsored by Po Leung Kuk. The competition has attracted teams from around the world.

== History ==
The first Primary Mathematics World Contest (PMWC) was organised in 1997. The sponsors of the competition are the charitable organisation Po Leung Kuk, the public university Hong Kong Institute of Education, and Panda Hotel. Competitions are held at the Panda Hotel, which is in the Tsuen Wan town of New Territories West.

In the 21st competition in 2018, there were 32 teams that represented Australia, Bulgaria, China, Hong Kong, Indonesia, Macau, Malaysia, Mongolia, the Philippines, Singapore, South Africa, Taiwan, the United States, Thailand, and Vietnam. The 22nd competition took place on five days in July 2019. After COVID-19 prevented the contest from being held in-person, Po Leung Kuk had restarted it according to a 2023 article in HK01.

== Format ==
The event has an individual and a team competition. The individual contest's participants have 90 minutes to finish 15 math questions. The ratio of gold to silver to bronze medals is 1:2:3, and half of the participants receive medals. In 2016, a student who got all the questions right received gold medals, while students who got one question wrong received a silver medal. In 2014, the cutoffs for bronze, silver, and gold were 10/15, 12/15, and 14/15 solves respectively.

During the team competition, team members have 60 minutes to finish 10 math questions. Each team has four people. First, the four participants are given 8 questions, where they have about 10 minutes to skim through them and distribute the problems amongst themselves. They then individually work on the questions they've selected until time is up. It is not required for each participant to get exactly 2 of the 8 questions. Afterwards, they are no longer allowed to work on these 8 questions and must work on the last 2 questions together as a group.
