= International Mathematics Competition =

Annual undergraduate maths competition

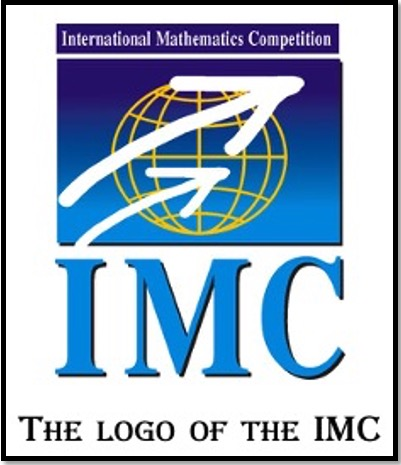

The International Mathematics Competition (IMC) for University Students is an annual mathematics competition open to all undergraduate aged students of mathematics. Participating students are expected to be at most twenty-three years of age at the time of the IMC, although some exceptions can be made. The IMC is primarily a competition for individuals, although most participating universities select and send one or more teams of students. The working language is English.

The IMC is a residential competition and all student participants are required to stay in the accommodation provided by the organisers. It aims to provide a friendly, comfortable and secure environment for university mathematics students to enjoy mathematics with their peers from all around the world, to broaden their world perspective and to be inspired to set mathematical goals for themselves that might not have been previously imaginable or thought possible.

Students from over 200 universities from over 50 countries have participated over the first thirty-one competitions. At the 29th IMC in 2022 participants were awarded Individual Result Prizes, Fair Play Prizes and Most Efficient Team Leader Prizes.

University College London has been involved in the organisation of the IMC and Professor John E. Jayne has served as the President from the beginning in 1994. The IMC runs over five or six days during which the competitors sit two five-hour examinations, each with five questions (six until 2008) chosen by a panel and representatives from the participating universities. Problems are from the fields of Algebra, Analysis (Real and Complex), Combinatorics and Geometry.

== History ==
The IMC began in 1994 in Plovdiv, Bulgaria, with 49 participants, mostly from Bulgaria, from 6 countries, and was hosted by Plovdiv University "Paisii Hilendarski". The 2nd, 3rd and 4th IMC were also hosted by Plovdiv University "Paisii Hilendarski" in Plovdiv. From 1996 to 1999 the IMC was one of the activities of the Structural Joint European Union TEMPUS Project #S_JEP-11087-96, entitled "Modular Education in Mathematics and Informatics", which was the flag ship European Union TEMPUS Project in Bulgaria at the time, aimed at bringing Bulgaria's university mathematics and computing degree programs into line with those in the European Union in preparation for Bulgaria's entry into the European Union. University College London was the Contractor for this European Union TEMPUS Project. In 1998 the 5th IMC was moved to Blagoevgrad, Bulgaria, and was hosted by both the South-West University "Neofit Rilski" in Blagoevgrad and the American University in Bulgaria. The 5th IMC had 80 participants from 9 countries, marking a significant milestone in its history.

The 6th IMC was hosted by Eötvös Loránd University and held on Lake Balaton in Keszthely, Hungary, the 7th IMC was hosted by University College London in London, the 8th IMC was hosted by Charles University in Prague, Czech Republic, the 9th IMC was hosted by the University of Warsaw in Warsaw, Poland, the 10th IMC was hosted by Babeș-Bolyai University in Cluj-Napoca, Romania, the 11th IMC was hosted by Ss. Cyril and Methodius University of Skopje in Skopje, Macedonia, the 12th IMC was hosted by American University in Bulgaria in Blagoevgrad, the 13th IMC was hosted by Odesa University in Odesa, Ukraine, the 14th IMC and 15th IMC were again hosted by the American University in Bulgaria in Blagoevgrad, and the 16th IMC was hosted by the Eötvös Loránd University in Budapest. In 2009 the 16th IMC had 347 student participants and 65 teams. Since 2010 the IMC has been hosted by the American University in Bulgaria, in Blagoevgrad, with assistance from the South-West University "Neofit Rilski" in Blagoevgrad. The 26th IMC had 360 student participants and 77 teams. The 27th and 28th IMCs were held on-line due to the global pandemic. The 29th IMC was hybrid with both in-person and on-line participants. It had 663 student participants and 100 teams. The 30th IMC returned to being on only in-person event. It had 393 student participants and 72 teams. The 32nd IMC had 434 student participants, and 73 team leaders, from 52 countries.

== Notable Past Award Winners ==
- Caucher Birkar, Fields Medal Winner and Professor at the University of Cambridge.
- Maryna Viazovska, Fields Medal Winner and Professor at EPFL-Swiss Federal Technology Institute of Lausanne.
- Roman Karasev. Professor at Moscow Institute of Physics and Technology
- Nima Anari, Professor at Stanford University.
- Maryam Saeedi, Professor at Carnegie Mellon University.
- Ali Kakhbod, Professor at the University of California, Berkeley.
- Gabriel Kreindler, Professor at Harvard University.
- Martin D. Kassabov, Professor at Cornell University.
- Andrej Zlatoš, Professor at UC San Diego.
- Marianna Csörnyei, Professor at the University of Chicago.
- Florian Herzig, Professor at the University of Toronto.
- Simion Filip, Professor at the University of Chicago.
- Rasool Etesami, Professor at the University of Illinois at Urbana-Champaign.
- Behrouz Touri, Professor at the University of California, San Diego.
- Kaveh Kasebian, Professor at Virginia Tech.
- Naser Talebizadeh Sardari, Professor at Penn State University.
- Jalal Etesami, Professor at the Technical University of Munich.
- Sam Nariman, Professor at Purdue University.
- Gaku Liu, Professor at the University of Washington.
- Djordje Milicevic, Professor at Bryn Mawr College.
- Anton Mellit, Assoz. Professor at the University of Vienna.
- Samuel Hapák, CEO, Director, WINCENT.

== Summary ==
Number	Year	Host City	Host Country	Dates
1st	IMC 1994	Plovdiv	Bulgaria	28 July–2 August
2nd	IMC 1995	Plovdiv	Bulgaria	2–7 August
3rd	IMC 1996	Plovdiv	Bulgaria	31 July–5 August
4th	IMC 1997	Plovdiv	Bulgaria	30 July–4 August
5th	IMC 1998	Blagoevgrad	Bulgaria	29 July–3 August
6th	IMC 1999	Keszthely	Hungary	29 July–2 August
7th	IMC 2000	London	England	26–31 July
8th	IMC 2001	Prague	Czech Republic	19–25 July
9th	IMC 2002	Warsaw	Poland	19–25 July
10th	IMC 2003	Cluj-Napoca	Romania	25–31 July
11th	IMC 2004	Skopje	North Macedonia	23–29 July
12th	IMC 2005	Blagoevgrad	Bulgaria	22–28 July
13th	IMC 2006	Odesa	Ukraine	20–26 July
14th	IMC 2007	Blagoevgrad	Bulgaria	3–9 August
15th	IMC 2008	Blagoevgrad	Bulgaria	25–31 July
16th	IMC 2009	Budapest	Hungary	25–30 July
17th	IMC 2010	Blagoevgrad	Bulgaria	24–30 July
18th	IMC 2011	Blagoevgrad	Bulgaria	28 July–3 August
19th	IMC 2012	Blagoevgrad	Bulgaria	26 July–1 August
20th	IMC 2013	Blagoevgrad	Bulgaria	6–12 August
21st	IMC 2014	Blagoevgrad	Bulgaria	29 July–4 August
22nd	IMC 2015	Blagoevgrad	Bulgaria	27 July–2 August
23rd	IMC 2016	Blagoevgrad	Bulgaria	25–31 July
24th	IMC 2017	Blagoevgrad	Bulgaria	31 July–6 August
25th	IMC 2018	Blagoevgrad	Bulgaria	22–28 July
26th	IMC 2019	Blagoevgrad	Bulgaria	28 July–3 August
27th	IMC 2020	Online	Online	25–30 July
28th	IMC 2021	Online	Online	2–7 August
29th	IMC 2022	Blagoevgrad	Bulgaria	1–7 August
30th	IMC 2023	Blagoevgrad	Bulgaria	31 July–6 August
31st	IMC 2024	Blagoevgrad	Bulgaria	5 August–11 August
32nd	IMC 2025	Blagoevgrad	Bulgaria	28 July–3 August
33rd	IMC 2026	Blagoevgrad	Bulgaria	27 July–3 August

== See also ==
- List of mathematics competitions
- Intermediate Mathematical Challenge
