= Hong Kong Mathematics Olympiad =

Mathematics competition for secondary students

Hong Kong Mathematics Olympiad (HKMO, Chinese: 香港數學競賽) is a mathematics competition held in Hong Kong every year, jointly organized by the Education University of Hong Kong and Education Bureau. At present, more than 250 secondary schools send teams of 4-6 students of or below Form 5 to enter the competition. It is made up of a Heat Event and a Final Event, which both forbid the usage of calculators and calculation assisting equipments (e.g. printed mathematical table). Though it bears the term Mathematics Olympiad, it has no relationship with the International Mathematical Olympiad.

== History ==
The predecessor of HKMO is the Inter-school Mathematics Olympiad initiated by the Mathematics Society of Northcote College of Education in 1974, which had attracted 20 secondary schools to participate. Since 1983, the competition is jointly conducted by the Mathematics Department of Northcote College of Education and the Mathematics Section of the Advisory Inspectorate Division of the Education Department. Also in 1983, the competition is formally renamed as Hong Kong Mathematics Olympiad.

== Format and scoring ==
=== Heat Event ===
The Heat Event is usually held in four venues, for contestants from schools on Hong Kong Island, and in Kowloon, New Territories East and New Territories West respectively. It comprises an individual event and a group event. Each team sends 4 contestants among 4–6 team members for each event.

For the individual event, 1 mark and 2 marks will be given to each correct answer in Part A and Part B respectively. The maximum score for a team should be 80.

For the group event, 2 marks will be given to each correct answer. The maximum score for a team should be 20.

For the geometric construction event, the maximum score for a team should be 20 (all working, including construction work, must be clearly shown).

In other words, a contesting school may earn 120 marks at most in the Heat Event. The top 50 may enter the Final Event.

=== Final Event ===
The Final Event is usually held at the Education University of Hong Kong in Tai Po. It comprises 4 individual events and 4 group events. Before the real events begin, there is a mock event which carries no marks. Each team may send any 4 students for the individual events, and any 4 students for the group events. For every event, only answers are required.

There are 4 questions in each Final Individual Event. The questions have to be solved by alternate contestants independently, and no discussions are allowed. For each event, the questions are interrelated, i.e. to solve the second question, the answer of the first question is needed, and to solve the third, the answer from the second is needed, etc..

There are also 4 questions in each Final Group Event, which may be interrelated or not. The four contestants shall complete each event together, and discussion is allowed.

For each event, 5 minutes are given. There are timekeepers to report the time taken used for each team in each event. The detailed scoring method is:

(A) Score for Accuracy

| Individual Events | Score | Group Events | Score |
|---|---|---|---|
| correct in (i) | 1 | Any 1 answer correct | 2 |
| correct in (ii) | 2 | Any 2 answers correct | 4 |
| correct in (iii) | 3 | Any 3 answers correct | 7 |
| correct in (iv) | 4 | All answers correct | 10 |

(B) Multiplying Factor for Speed

| Time Taken | Multiplying Factor |
|---|---|
| Within 1 minute | 4 |
| Within 2 minutes | 3 |
| Within 3 minutes | 2 |
| More than 3 minutes | 1 |

(C) Bonus Score
If all answers from a team in an event are correct, 20 marks are given as a bonus.

The score for an event is equal to (A)×(B)+(C). The honour of Champion, 1st Runner-up and 2nd Runner-up are given according to the total score earned in eight events.

== Past champions ==
- 1984: Hong Kong Sze Yap Commercial & Industrial Association Wong Tai Shan Memorial School
- 1985: Methodist College
- 1986: Ying Wa College
- 1987: King's College
- 1988: Ying Wa College
- 1989: King's College
- 1990: Clementi Secondary School
- 1991: Queen's College
- 1992: New Territories Heung Yee Kuk Yuen Long District Secondary School
- 1993: Clementi Secondary School
- 1994: Queen's College
- 1995: Tsuen Wan Public Ho Chuen Yiu Memorial School
- 1996: Mongkok Workers' Children School (Secondary Section)
- 1997: Queen's College
- 1998: Diocesan Boys' School
- 1999: SKH Bishop Baker Secondary School
- 2000: La Salle College
- 2001: Yuen Long Merchants Association Secondary School
- 2002: King's College
- 2003: La Salle College
- 2004: Bishop Hall Jubilee School
- 2005: La Salle College
- 2006: Cheung Chuk Shan College
- 2007: La Salle College
- 2008: La Salle College
- 2009: La Salle College
- 2010: St. Paul's Co-educational College
- 2011: St. Paul's Co-educational College
- 2012: La Salle College
- 2013: La Salle College
- 2014: La Salle College
- 2015: La Salle College
- 2016: La Salle College
- 2017: Pui Ching Middle School
- 2018: Pui Ching Middle School
- 2019: La Salle College
- 2020: (Cancelled)
- 2021: St. Paul's Co-educational College
- 2022: Diocesan Boys' School
- 2023: Diocesan Boys' School
- 2024: Diocesan Boys' School
- 2025: St. Paul's Co-educational College

== See also ==
- List of mathematics competitions
- Education in Hong Kong
- Hong Kong Institute of Education
- Hong Kong Mathematical High Achievers Selection Contest
- International Mathematics Olympiad
