= Mathematical Olympiads for Elementary and Middle Schools =

Mathematics competition

Mathematical Olympiads for Elementary and Middle Schools (MOEMS) is a worldwide math competition, organized by a not for profit foundation with the same name. It is held yearly from November through March with one test administered each month. Tests are given at individual schools and results are sent to MOEMS for scoring. Schools, home schools and institutions may participate in the contest. Two dozen other nations also participate in the competition. There are two divisions, Elementary and Middle School. Elementary level problems are for grades 4-6 and Middle School level problems are for grades 6-8, though 4-5 graders may participate in Middle School problems. Hundreds of thousands of students participate annually in MOEMS events.

MOEMS plans soon to develop an online teacher training program.

== Layout ==
Each year, there are 25 problems spread across 5 tests. Each test has 5 problems and is 30 minutes. There are awards to student who achieve within the top 50%, top 8%, top 2%, and the overall team winner.

== History ==
First set up in 1977 by founder George Lenchner (1917–2006), MOEMS became a public competition in 1979. Lenchner, who died after decades in service to the math education community, wrote several books on elementary problem solving used by many MOEMS teachers and students. His obituary was featured in the Sunday New York Times on May 14, 2006.

The current MOEMS Director is Meryl Fordin.
