= Asian Pacific Mathematics Olympiad =

Regional mathematics competition

The Asian Pacific Mathematics Olympiad (APMO) starting from 1989 is a regional mathematics competition which involves countries from the Asian Pacific region. The United States also takes part in the APMO. Every year, APMO is held in the afternoon of the second Monday of March for participating countries in the North and South Americas, and in the morning of the second Tuesday of March for participating countries on the Western Pacific and in Asia.

== APMO's Aims ==
- the discovering, encouraging and challenging of mathematically gifted school students in all Pacific-Rim countries
- the fostering of friendly international relations and cooperation between students and teachers in the Pacific-Rim Region
- the creating of an opportunity for the exchange of information on school syllabi and practice throughout the Pacific Region
- the encouragement and support of mathematical involvement with Olympiad type activities, not only in the APMO participating countries, but also in other Pacific-Rim countries.

== Scoring and Format ==
The APMO contest consists of one four-hour paper consisting of five questions of varying difficulty and each having a maximum score of 7 points. Contestants should not have formally enrolled at a university (or equivalent post-secondary institution) and they must be younger than 20 years of age on 1 July of the year of the contest.

== APMO Member Nations/Regions ==
- Argentina
- Australia
- Azerbaijan
- Bolivia
- Bangladesh
- Brazil
- Canada
- Colombia
- Costa Rica
- Ivory Coast
- El Salvador
- Ecuador
- Hong Kong
- India
- Indonesia
- Iran
- Japan
- Kazakhstan
- South Korea
- Kyrgyzstan
- Malaysia
- Mexico
- Nicaragua
- New Zealand
- Pakistan
- Panama
- Peru
- Philippines
- Russia
- Saudi Arabia
- Singapore
- Syria
- Taiwan
- Tajikistan
- Thailand
- Trinidad and Tobago
- Turkmenistan
- Uruguay
- United States
- Morocco

=== Observer Nations ===
Honduras and South Africa

== Results ==
- https://cms.math.ca/Competitions/APMO/
- https://www.apmo-official.org/
- https://www.apmo-official.org/2017/ResultsByName.html
- http://imomath.com/index.php?options=Ap&mod=23&ttn=Asian-Pacific

== See also ==
- International Mathematical Olympiad
