= Mathematical Society of the Philippines =

- Formation: 1973
- Headquarters: University of the Philippines Diliman
- Website: www.mathsociety.ph

The Mathematical Society of the Philippines (MSP) is a professional organization for mathematicians in the Philippines, recognized by the International Mathematical Union as the main national mathematics society for its country. It was founded in 1973 following a sequence of discussions and meetings the previous year, one of which was the July 1972 meeting of the Southeast Asian Mathematical Society in Singapore.

The society aims to promote interest of mathematics and its applications, knowledge in mathematics and enable mathematical research. It publishes a Bulletin Matimyas Matematika and runs an annual convention in May, both devoted to mathematical research and educational issues. It is also involved in training a team to represent the Philippines at the International Mathematical Olympiad, selected from the twenty national finalists from the Philippine Mathematical Olympiad who join the Mathematical Olympiad Summer Camp.
