= Kosovar Mathematical Society =

Mathematical society in Kosovo

- Shoqata e Matematikanëve të Kosovës
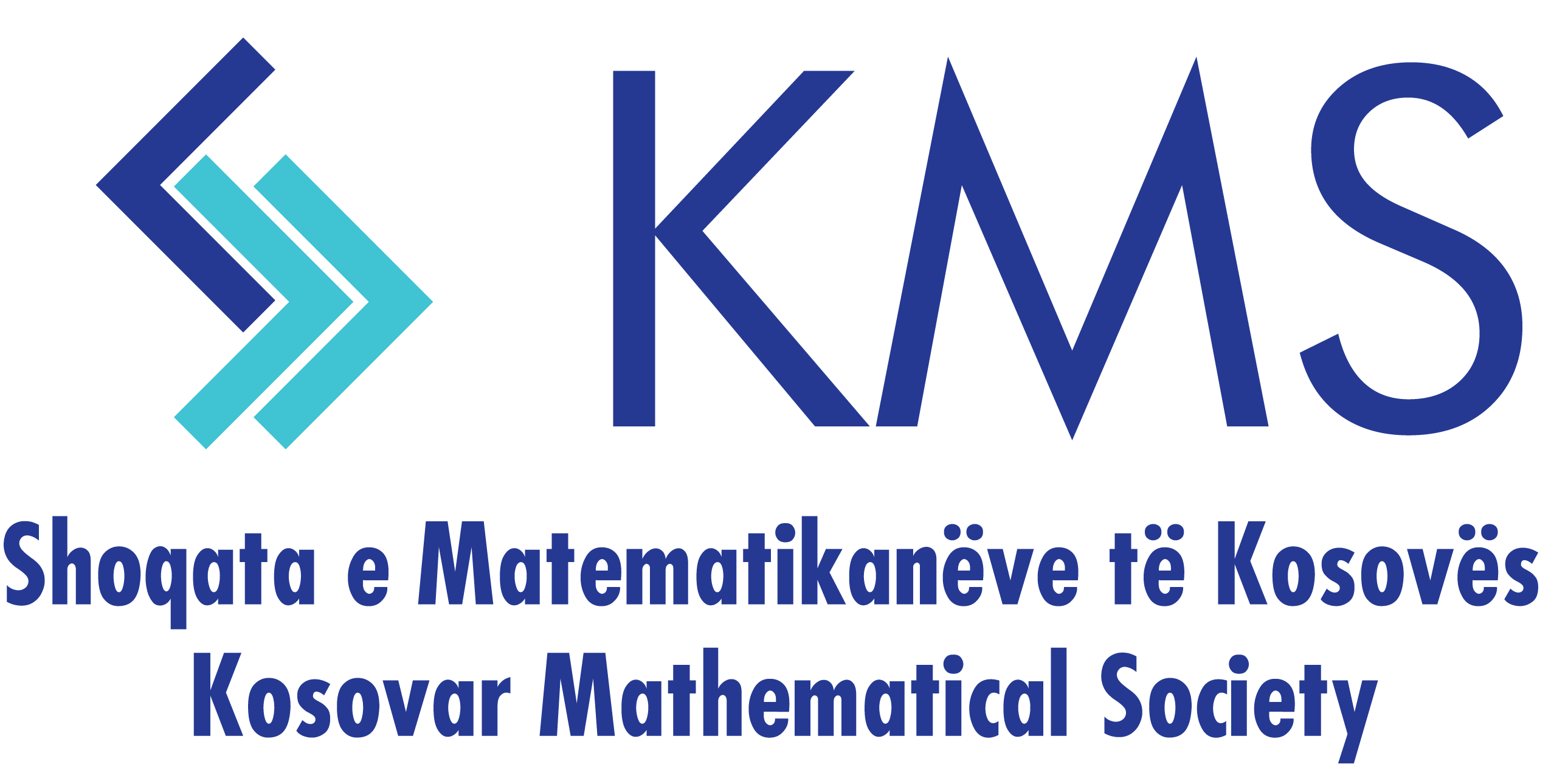
- Abbreviation: KMS, SHMK
- Formation: 22 August 2008; 17 years ago
- Type: Mathematical society
- Headquarters: Pristina
- Location: Kosovo
- President: Valdete Rexhëbeqaj Hamiti
- Website: kms-ks.org

The Kosovar Mathematical Society or KMS (Albanian: Shoqata e Matematikanëve të Kosovës, SHMK) is a mathematical society founded in Kosovo in 2008. The KMS is based in Pristina, and has been a member of the European Mathematical Society since 2012.

== History ==
The Kosovar Mathematical Society was founded on 22 August 2008 in Pristina, the same year that Kosovo declared its independence from Serbia. The society was founded by Qëndrim Gashi, who served as the first president. Gashi later worked as the Kosovan ambassador to France.

== Activities and publications ==
Since 2011 the KMS has coordinated the Kosovan entry at the International Mathematical Olympiad. It sometimes faces financial difficulties in doing so. The society does not take part in the Balkan Mathematical Olympiad for political reasons.

The Kosovar Mathematical Society publishes the Bulletin of Mathematical Analysis and Applications jointly with the Department of Mathematics and Computer Science of the University of Pristina. The Bulletin is published in English, has been purely electronic since its founding in 2009, and is indexed by zbMATH.

== Presidents ==
The Kosovar Mathematical Society has had 5 presidents since its founding.

- Qëndrim Gashi (2008–2011)
- Qamil Haxhibeqiri (2012–2015)
- Muhib Lohaj (2016–2018)
- Armend Shabani (2019–2022)
- Valdete Rexhëbeqaj Hamiti (2022–present)

== See also ==
- List of mathematical societies
