= Tournament of the Towns =

The Tournament of Towns (International Mathematical Tournament of Towns, Турнир Городов, Международный Математический Турнир Городов) is an international mathematical competition for school students originating in Russia. The contest was created by mathematician Nikolay Konstantinov and has participants from over 100 cities in many countries.

== Organization ==
There are two rounds in this contest: Fall (October) and Spring (February–March) of the same academic year. Both have an O-Level (Basic) paper and an A-Level (Advanced) paper separated by 1–2 weeks. The O-Level contains around 5 questions and the A-Level contains around 7 questions. The duration of the exams is 5 hours for both Levels. The A-Level problems are more difficult than O-Level but have a greater maximum score. Participating students are divided into two divisions; Junior (usually grades 7–10) and Senior (two last school grades, usually grades 11–12). To account for age differences inside of each division, students in different grades have different loadings (coefficients). A contestant's final score is his/her highest score from the four exams. It is not necessary albeit recommended to write all four exams.

Towns are given handicaps to account for differences in population. A town's score is the average of the scores of its N best students, where its population is N hundred thousand. It is also worth noting that the minimum value of N is 5.

== Philosophy ==
Tournament of Towns differs from many other similar competitions by its philosophy relying much more upon ingenuity than the drill. First, problems are difficult (especially in A Level in the Senior division where they are comparable with those at International Mathematical Olympiad but much more ingenious and less technical). Second, it allows the participants to choose problems they like as for each paper the participant's score is the sum of his/her 3 best answers.

The problems are mostly combinatorial, with the occasional geometry, number theory or algebra problem. They have a different flavor to problems seen in other mathematics competitions, and are usually quite challenging. Some of the problems have become classics, in particular two from the Autumn 1984 paper.

== History ==
The first competition, held in the 1979–1980 academic year, was called the Olympiad of Three Towns. They were Moscow, Kiev and Riga. The reputation of the competition grew and the following year, it was called Tournament of Towns. The Tournament of Towns was almost closed down in its early years of development but in 1984 it gained recognition when it became a sub-committee of the USSR Academy of Sciences.

== Awards ==
Diplomas are awarded by the Central Committee to students who have achieved high scores (after their papers have been rechecked by the Central Jury). Different certificates are also awarded by Local Committees.

== Summer Conferences ==
Students performing outstandingly (higher than Diploma) receive an invitation to the Annual International Mathematical Tournament of Towns Summer Conference where during several days they participate in team research projects consisting of the sequence of related problems.
