= Flanders Mathematics Olympiad =

Flemish mathematics competition

The Flanders Mathematics Olympiad (Dutch: Vlaamse Wiskunde Olympiade; VWO) is a Flemish mathematics competition for students in grades 9 through 12. Two tiers of this competition exist: one for 9th- and 10th-graders (Dutch: Junior Wiskunde Olympiade; JWO), and one for 11th- and 12th-graders. It is a feeder competition for the International Mathematical Olympiad.

== History ==
The Olympiad was founded in 1985, replacing a system previously used since 1969 in which Flemish students were nominated to the IMO by their teachers. As of 2015, 20,000 students participate annually.

In 2015, the founders of the Olympiad, Paul Igodt of the Katholieke Universiteit Leuven and Frank De Clerck of Ghent University, were given the career award for science communication of the Royal Flemish Academy of Belgium for Science and the Arts for their work.

== Procedure ==
The competition lasts three rounds. During the first and second rounds, students must answer 30 multiple-choice mathematics problems. The first round occurs in schools, and the second round is organized by province, and is administered at various universities. The first round has a three-hour time limit for completion, the second round has a two-hour time limit. The final round consists of four problems which require a detailed and coherent essay-type response. After the final round, three contestants are selected to compete in the International Mathematical Olympiad, making up half of the team from Belgium; the other half of the team comes from Wallonia.
