= Olimpíada Brasileira de Matemática =

Annual mathematics competition for Brazilian students

The Brazilian Mathematical Olympiad (Portuguese: 'Olimpíada Brasileira de Matemática', also known as OBM) is a mathematics competition held every year for students of Brazil. The participants are awarded gold, silver and bronze medals in accordance with their performance. The main purpose of this competition is to help in selecting students to represent Brazil at the International Mathematical Olympiad.

== History ==
The Brazilian Mathematical Olympiad has been held since 1979. On that occasion, 11 students were awarded in 1st, 2nd, and 3rd places, and 15 were awarded in the other categories.

In 1991, the competition started to have two levels: Junior, for students with a maximum of 15 years; and Senior, for high school students. Over the years, there have been changes, such as the creation, in 2001, of the University level, with two phases.

In 2017, OBM was integrated into OBMEP. It is then carried out in a single phase, for levels 1, 2, and 3, only for invited students, considering, among other criteria, the score obtained in the second phase of the OBMEP. The University level is maintained, in two phases, but it counts on the individual registration of the undergraduate student.

In 2019, the Brazilian Mathematical Olympic Association (AOBM) began hosting Torneio Meninas na Matemática (Girls in Mathematics Tournament), also known as TM². The event is also annual, however exclusive to female students from 8th grade onwards, and since 2025, 6th grade onwards. The awarded students in this competition get to participate in the following year's OBM.

Since 2020, another competition organized by AOBM, Competição Elon Lages Lima de Matemática (named after Brazilian mathematician Elon Lages Lima), serves as the official first phase of OBM for university students, with the second phase now being labeled "Fase Única" (Single Phase). Moreover, since 2022, students in Middle and High School can also subscribe themselves to participate in Competição Jacob Palis Jr. de Matemática (named after Brazilian mathematician Jacob Palis), in which the awarded students can take part in the OBM edition of the same year (female students who are awarded also compete in the following edition of TM²).

== Goals ==
- Decisively interfere in the improvement of Mathematics teaching in Brazil, improving students and teachers through participation in the Olympics.
- Discover young people with exceptional mathematical talent and put them in contact with professional mathematicians and high-level research institutions, providing favorable conditions for the formation and development of a research career.
- Select and train students who will represent Brazil in international Mathematics Olympiads, based on their performance at OBM.
- Support regional mathematics competitions throughout Brazil.
- Organize international mathematics competitions based in Brazil.

== Participation levels ==
The exams are subdivided into four levels, according to the student's education level.

- Level 1: Middle school student from 6th or 7th year (grade level)
- Level 2: Middle school student from 8th or 9th year or any student who finished Middle school less than one year and has not yet been admitted into the High school
- Level 3: High school student from any year (1st, 2nd, or 3rd)
- University: Higher education student from any course or any student who finished High school less than one year and has not yet gotten into the university.

== See also ==
- Olimpíada Brasileira de Matemática das Escolas Públicas
