= Baltic Way (mathematical contest) =

Annual mathematics competition established in 1990

The Baltic Way mathematical contest has been organized annually since 1990, usually in early November, to commemorate the Baltic Way demonstration of 1989. Unlike most international mathematical competitions, Baltic Way is a true team contest. Each team consists of five secondary-school students, who are allowed and expected to collaborate on the twenty problems during the four and a half hours of the contest.

Originally, the three Baltic states participated, but the list of invitees has since grown to include all countries around the Baltic Sea; Germany sends a team representing only its northernmost parts, and Russia a team from St. Petersburg. Iceland is invited on grounds of being the first state to recognize the newfound independence of the Baltic states. Extra "guest" teams are occasionally invited at the discretion of the organizers: Israel was invited in 2001, Belarus in 2004 and 2014, Belgium in 2005, South Africa in 2011, the Netherlands in 2015, Ireland in 2021 and Ukraine in 2024, 2025 and 2026. Responsibility for organizing the contest circulates among the regular participants.

== History ==
Year	Location	Teams	Winning team	Second place	Third place
1990	Riga, Latvia	3	Latvia	?	?
1991	Tartu, Estonia	6	Latvia	?	?
1992	Vilnius, Lithuania	8	Denmark	St. Petersburg	Poland
1993	Riga, Latvia	8	Poland	Latvia	Estonia
1994	Tartu, Estonia	9	St. Petersburg	Latvia	Poland
1995	Västerås, Sweden	9	Poland	Latvia	Sweden
1996	Valkeakoski, Finland	10	Poland	Latvia	Sweden
1997	Copenhagen, Denmark	11	Poland	Germany	Estonia & Sweden
1998	Warsaw, Poland	11	Latvia	Estonia	Poland
1999	Reykjavík, Iceland	10	Estonia	Sweden	Norway
2000	Oslo, Norway	10	Poland	Latvia	Estonia
2001	Hamburg, Germany	11	Israel	Estonia	Latvia
2002	Tartu, Estonia	11	St. Petersburg	Norway	Lithuania
2003	Riga, Latvia	11	St. Petersburg	Poland	Estonia
2004	Vilnius, Lithuania	12	St. Petersburg	Poland	Belarus
2005	Stockholm, Sweden	12	Poland	Finland	St. Petersburg
2006	Turku, Finland	11	St. Petersburg	Poland	Lithuania
2007	Copenhagen, Denmark	11	Poland	St. Petersburg	Germany
2008	Gdańsk, Poland	11	Poland	Germany	St. Petersburg
2009	Trondheim, Norway	11	St. Petersburg	Poland	Finland
2010	Reykjavík, Iceland	10	Poland	Lithuania	Germany
2011	Greifswald, Germany	11	Poland	Latvia	Germany
2012	Tartu, Estonia	11	St. Petersburg	Poland	Lithuania
2013	Riga, Latvia	11	Latvia	St. Petersburg	Poland
2014	Vilnius, Lithuania	12	St. Petersburg	Germany	Poland
2015	Stockholm, Sweden	12	St. Petersburg	Poland	Estonia
2016	Oulu, Finland	11	Poland & St. Petersburg	-	Sweden
2017	Sorø, Denmark	11	St. Petersburg	Germany	Poland
2018	St. Petersburg, Russia	11	Germany	St. Petersburg	Denmark
2019	Szczecin, Poland	11	St. Petersburg	Poland	Estonia
2020	Online	10	Germany	Norway	Poland
2021	Reykjavík, Iceland	12	St. Petersburg	Estonia	Germany
2022	Tromsø, Norway	10	Poland & Germany	-	Lithuania
2023	Flensburg, Germany	10	Germany	Sweden	Lithuania
2024	Tartu, Estonia	11	Poland	Estonia	Germany
2025	Riga, Latvia	11	Germany	Estonia	Poland
2026	Vilnius, Lithuania	11	Latvia	Poland	Norway & Sweden

== External links and references ==
=== Problems, solutions, results and links (some of them broken) to web sites 1990-2010 ===
Estonian Math Competitions. "Baltic Way Mathematical Contests".

=== Baltic Way contest web sites ===
- Organisers, Baltic Way 2012. "Baltic Way '12, Tartu, Estonia".
- Organisers, Baltic Way 2013. "Mathematical Team Competition Baltic Way 2013".
- Organisers, Baltic Way 2014. "Baltic Way 2014". Archived from the original on 2016-03-13.
- Organisers, Baltic Way 2015. "Baltic Way 2015". Archived from the original on 2016-03-15.
- Organisers, Baltic Way 2016. "Baltic Way 2016, Mathematical group contest".
- Organisers, Baltic Way 2022. "Baltic Way 2022".

=== Problems ===
- Baltic Way Mathematical Contests | Problems with Solutions (1990 - 2023)
- Marcus Better (1997). Baltic way 1990-1996: mathematical team competition. Stockholm, Sweden: Department of Mathematics, Stockholm University.
- Uve Nummert, Jan Willemson (2002). Baltic Way Mathematical Team Contest 1997-2001. Tartu, Estonia: Estonian Mathematical Society. ISBN 9985-9235-9-6.
- Rasmus Villemoes (2007). Baltic Way 2002-2006. Problems and solutions. Århus, Denmark: Department of Mathematical Sciences, University of Aarhus.
- Art of Problem Solving Community. "International Competitions Baltic Way".
- IMO Compendium Group. "Baltic Way".
