= Mathematical olympiad =

Math competition

A mathematical olympiad is a mathematical competition where participants are examined by problem-solving and may win medals or achievements depending on their performance. It is usually aimed at pre-university students, and therefore, much of olympiad mathematics consists of elementary mathematics, though solutions may involve the use of calculus or higher-level mathematics. The biggest mathematics olympiad is the International Mathematical Olympiad. Since they measure some mathematical abilities of the students, They identify talented or gifted students in mathematics, who often receive opportunities for scholarships at universities.

== History ==
The concept of mathematics competitions dates back to the late 19th century. A one-off competition for 70 primary school students was held in Bucharest in May 1885, but little is known about it. A better-documented Eötvös Competition in Hungary became one of the earliest organized contests in 1894. Romania followed with another competition, this time for secondary school students, in June 1898. USSR introduced regular math olympiads in the 1930s, and the predecessor of the Putnam Competition started in 1938 in the US.

The success of these national competitions eventually led to the establishment of the International Mathematics Olympiad, which has grown from 7 participating countries in 1959 to over 100 countries in recent years.

== Curriculum ==
Modern olympiad mathematics can be split into four categories: algebra, combinatorics, geometry, and number theory. Algebra is restricted to elementary algebra, number theory is restricted to elementary number theory, and geometry is usually restricted to Euclidean plane geometry. While never required, the use of non-elementary techniques like calculus, linear algebra, algebraic number theory, algebraic geometry and projective geometry is allowed, and can often lead to more elegant solutions.

== See also ==
- International Mathematical Olympiad selection process
- United States of America Mathematical Olympiad
- Brazilian Mathematical Olympiad
