= List of International Mathematical Olympiads =

Logo of the International Mathematical Olympiad

The first of the International Mathematical Olympiads (IMOs) was held in Romania in 1959. The oldest of the International Science Olympiads, the IMO has since been held annually, except in 1980. That year, the competition initially planned to be held in Mongolia was cancelled due to the Soviet invasion of Afghanistan. Because the competition was initially founded for Eastern European countries participating in the Warsaw Pact, under the influence of the Eastern Bloc, the earlier IMOs were hosted only in Eastern European countries, gradually spreading to other nations.

The first IMO was held in Romania in 1959. Seven countries entered – Bulgaria, Czechoslovakia, East Germany, Hungary, Poland, Romania and the Soviet Union – with the hosts finishing as the top-ranked nation. The number of participating countries has since risen: 14 countries took part in 1969, 50 in 1989, and 104 in 2009.

North Korea is the only country whose entire team has been caught cheating, resulting in its disqualification at the 32nd IMO in 1991 and the 51st IMO in 2010. (However, the 2010 case was controversial.) There have been other disqualifications of contestants due to cheating, but such cases are not officially made public. In January 2011, Google gave €1 million to the IMO organization to help cover the costs of the events from 2011 to 2015.

== List of Olympiads ==
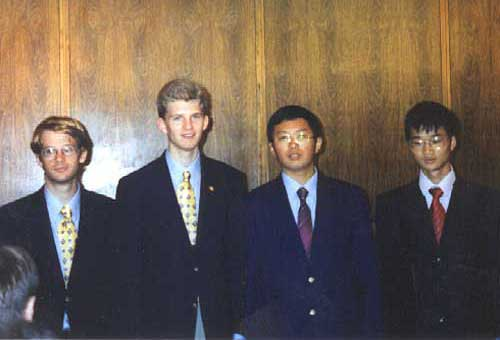
The four perfect scorers in the 2001 IMO. From left to right: Gabriel Carroll, Reid Barton, Zhiqiang Zhang, and Liang Xiao.

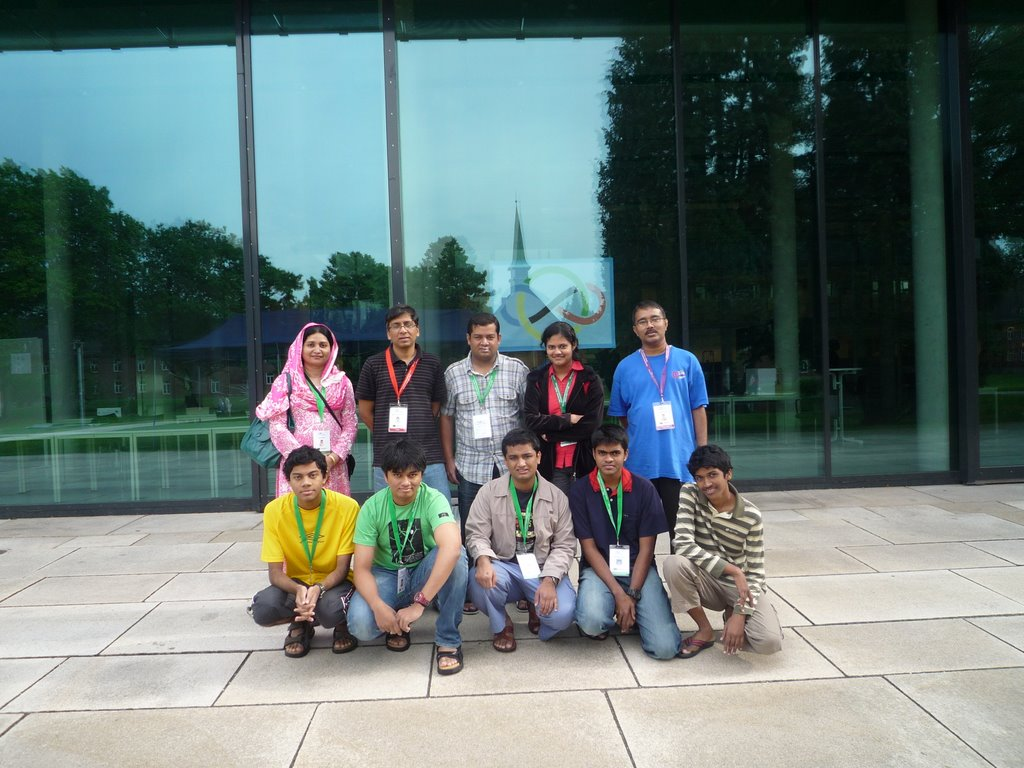
The Bangladesh team at the 2009 IMO

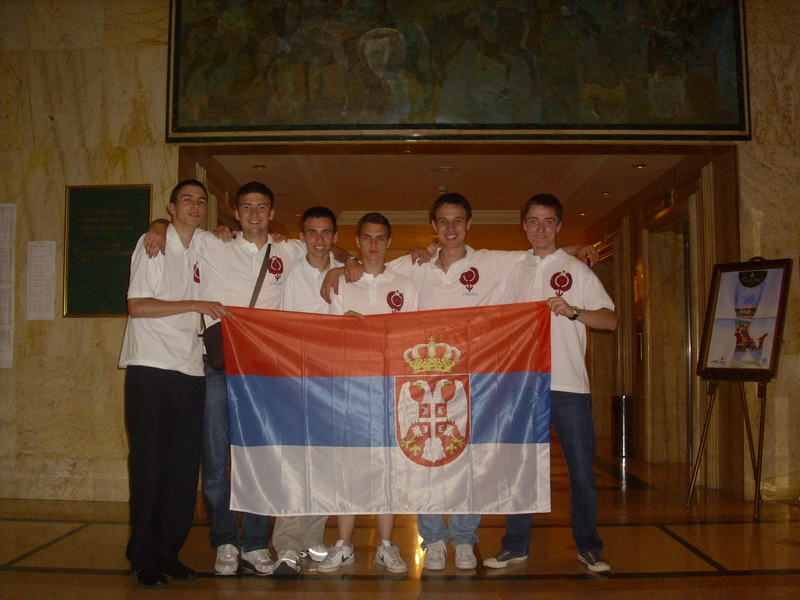
Serbia's team for the 2010 IMO

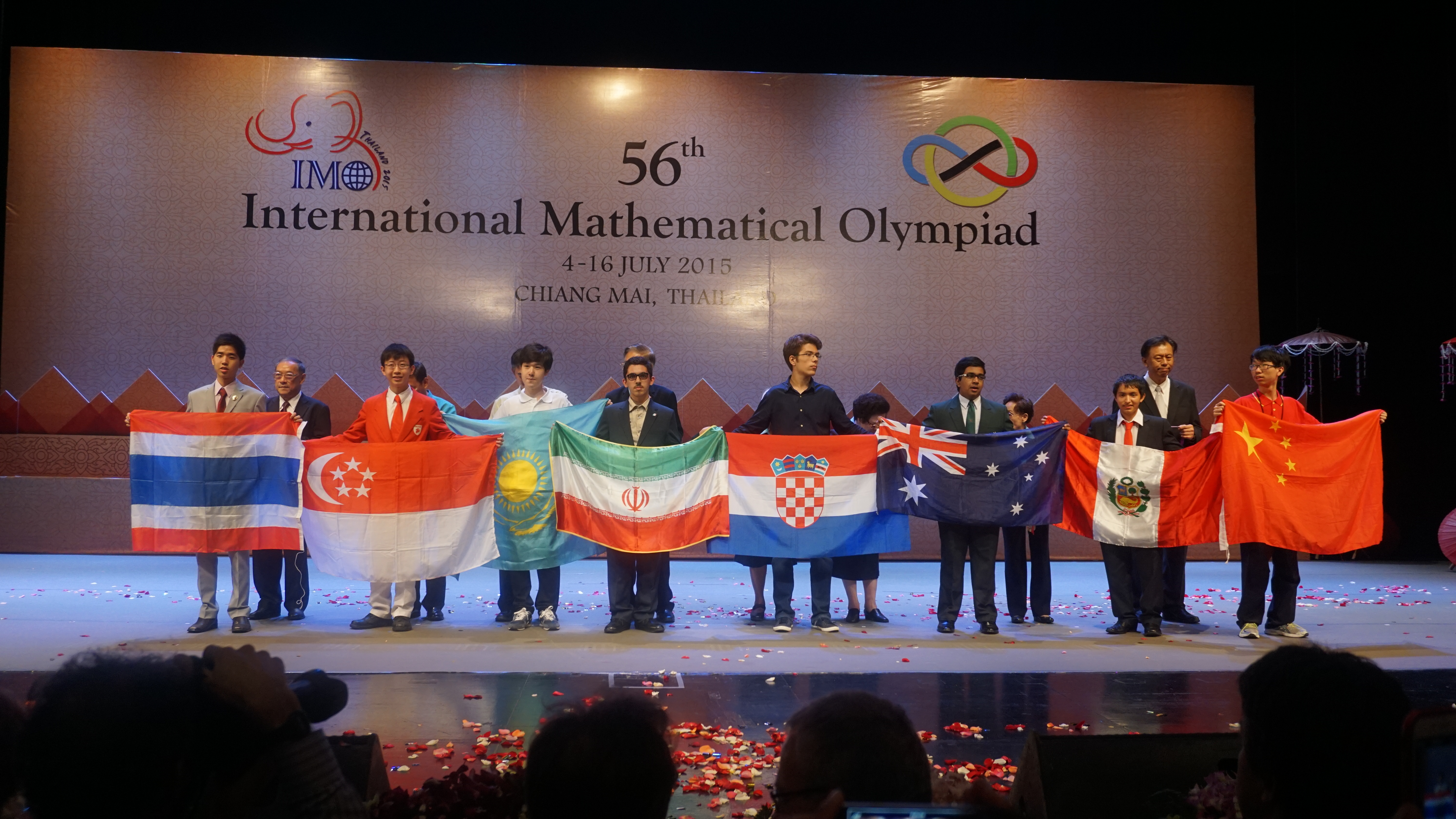
The closing ceremony of the 2015 IMO

#	Venue	Year	Date	Top-ranked country	References
1	(Romania) Brașov and Bucharest	1959	June 23 – July 31	Romania	
2	(Romania) Sinaia	1960	July 18 – July 25	Czechoslovakia	
3	(Hungary) Veszprém	1961	July 6 – July 16	Hungary	
4	(Czechoslovakia) České Budějovice	1962	July 7 – July 15	Hungary	
5	(Poland) Warsaw and Wrocław	1963	July 5 – July 13	Soviet Union	
6	(Soviet Union) Moscow	1964	June 30 – July 10	Soviet Union	
7	(East Germany) East Berlin	1965	June 13 – July 13	Soviet Union	
8	(Bulgaria) Sofia	1966	July 3 – July 13	Soviet Union	
9	(Socialist Federal Republic of Yugoslavia) Cetinje	1967	July 7 – July 13	Soviet Union	
10	(Soviet Union) Moscow	1968	July 5 – July 18	East Germany	
11	(Romania) Bucharest	1969	July 5 – July 20	Hungary	
12	(Hungary) Keszthely	1970	July 8 – July 22	Hungary	
13	(Czechoslovakia) Žilina	1971	July 10 – July 21	Hungary	
14	(Poland) Toruń	1972	July 5 – July 17	Soviet Union	
15	(Soviet Union) Moscow	1973	July 5 – July 16	Soviet Union	
16	(East Germany) Erfurt and East Berlin	1974	July 4 – July 17	Soviet Union	
17	(Bulgaria) Burgas and Sofia	1975	July 3 – July 16	Hungary	
18	(Austria) Lienz	1976	July 2 – July 21	Soviet Union	
19	(Socialist Federal Republic of Yugoslavia) Belgrade	1977	July 1 – July 13	United States	
20	(Romania) Bucharest	1978	July 3 – July 10	Romania	
21	(United Kingdom) London	1979	June 30 – July 9	Soviet Union	
-	The 1980 IMO was due to be held in Mongolia. It was cancelled, and split into two unofficial events in Europe.				
22	(United States) Washington, D.C.	1981	July 8 – July 20	United States	
23	(Hungary) Budapest	1982	July 5 – July 14	West Germany	
24	(France) Paris	1983	July 3 – July 12	West Germany	
25	(Czechoslovakia) Prague	1984	June 29 – July 10	Soviet Union	
26	(Finland) Joutsa	1985	June 29 – July 11	Romania	
27	(Poland) Warsaw	1986	July 4 – July 15	Soviet Union; United States	
28	(Cuba) Havana	1987	July 5 – July 16	Romania	
29	(Australia) Sydney and Canberra	1988	July 9 – July 21	Soviet Union	
30	(West Germany) Braunschweig	1989	July 13 – July 24	China	
31	(China) Beijing	1990	July 8 – July 19	China	
32	(Sweden) Sigtuna	1991	July 12 – July 23	Soviet Union	(Note: 1991 marked the Soviet Union's last participation. From 1992, former Soviet Union countries – including Russia – entered separately.)
33	(Russia) Moscow	1992	July 10 – July 21	China	
34	(Turkey) Istanbul	1993	July 13 – July 24	China	
35	Hong Kong (Note: At the time of the Olympiad, Hong Kong was under British colonial rule.)	1994	July 8 – July 20	United States	
36	(Canada) Toronto	1995	July 13 – July 25	China	
37	(India) Mumbai	1996	July 5 – July 17	Romania	
38	(Argentina) Mar del Plata	1997	July 18 – July 31	China	
39	(Taiwan) Taipei	1998	July 10 – July 21	Iran	
40	(Romania) Bucharest	1999	July 10 – July 22	China; Russia	
41	(South Korea) Daejeon	2000	July 13 – July 25	China	
42	(United States) Washington, D.C.	2001	July 1 – July 14	China	
43	(United Kingdom) Glasgow	2002	July 19 – July 30	China	
44	(Japan) Tokyo	2003	July 7 – July 19	Bulgaria	
45	(Greece) Athens	2004	July 6 – July 18	China	
46	(Mexico) Mérida	2005	July 8 – July 19	China	
47	(Slovenia) Ljubljana	2006	July 6 – July 18	China	
48	(Vietnam) Hanoi	2007	July 19 – July 31	Russia	
49	(Spain) Madrid	2008	July 10 – July 22	China	
50	(Germany) Bremen	2009	July 10 – July 22	China	
51	(Kazakhstan) Astana	2010	July 2 – July 14	China	
52	(Netherlands) Amsterdam	2011	July 13 – July 24	China	
53	(Argentina) Mar del Plata	2012	July 4 – July 16	South Korea	
54	(Colombia) Santa Marta	2013	July 18 – July 28	China	
55	(South Africa) Cape Town	2014	July 3 – July 13	China	
56	(Thailand) Chiang Mai	2015	July 4 – July 16	United States	
57	Hong Kong	2016	July 6 – July 16	United States	
58	(Brazil) Rio de Janeiro	2017	July 12 – July 23	South Korea	
59	(Romania) Cluj-Napoca	2018	July 3 – July 14	United States	
60	(United Kingdom) Bath	2019	July 11 – July 22	China; United States	
61	(Russia) St. Petersburg (online) (Note: Following the COVID-19 pandemic, the 2020 IMO was postponed from July to September hoping to keep the competition in-person. Then it was changed to a virtual event.) (Note: For the two virtual IMOs, all problems were selected by the Problem Selection Committee instead of the Jury made up of all team leaders, and problems were sent to the team leaders shortly before the exams for translation. Each team took the IMO exam at a national exam centre, and starting times of all exams were in the interval between 07:30 and 12:00 UTC (both ends included) of each exam day. An IMO Commissioner of another nationality was present at each centre to oversee the whole exam, and the IMO Chief Invigilator monitored all exams using webcams.)	2020	September 19 – September 28	China	
62	(Russia) St. Petersburg (online) (Note: The 2021 IMO was originally to be held in Washington D.C., US. The US gave up hosting after the COVID-19 pandemic had started.)	2021	July 14 – July 24	China	
63	(Norway) Oslo (hybrid)	2022	July 6 – July 16	China	
64	(Japan) Chiba	2023	July 2 – July 13	China	
65	(United Kingdom) Bath (Note: The originally determined location for hosting the 2024 IMO was Ukraine. Due to the recent conflicts between the country and Russia, the location was changed to Bath, in which the 2019 IMO was hosted.)	2024	July 11 – July 22	United States	
66	(Australia) Sunshine Coast	2025	July 10 – July 20	China	
67	(China) Shanghai	2026	July 10 – July 21	China	
68	(Hungary) Budapest	2027	July 16 – July 26	TBD	
69	(Saudi Arabia) Thuwal	2028	July 7 – July 18	TBD	
70	(Mongolia) Ulaanbaatar	2029	TBD	TBD	
71	(Switzerland) Lausanne	2030	July 18 – July 28	TBD	

== See also ==
- Asian Pacific Mathematics Olympiad
- Provincial Mathematical Olympiad
- List of mathematics competitions
- List of International Mathematical Olympiad participants
- List of countries by medal count at International Mathematical Olympiad

== Bibliography ==
- Olson, Steve (2004). Count Down. Houghton Mifflin. ISBN 0-618-25141-3.
- Lord, Mary (July 23, 2001). "Michael Jordans of math – U.S. Student whizzes stun the cipher world". U.S. News & World Report. 131 (3): 26.
