= Bjorn Poonen =

American mathematician

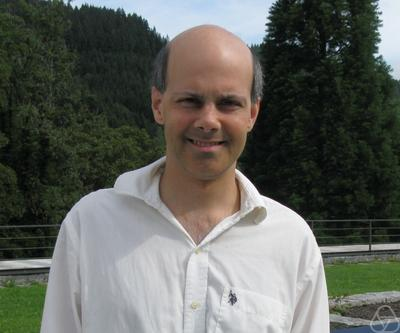
- Poonen at Oberwolfach in 2011
- Born: July 27, 1968 (age 58); Boston, Massachusetts
- Education: University of California, Berkeley; Harvard University
- Awards: Chauvenet Prize (2011); Fellow, American Mathematical Society (2012); Fellow, American Academy of Arts and Sciences (2012); Doob Prize (2023)
- Scientific career
- Fields: Arithmetic geometry
- Workplaces: MIT
- Thesis: The Mordell-Weil theorem, rigidity, and pairings for Drinfeld modules (1994)
- Doctoral advisor: Kenneth Alan Ribet
- Doctoral students: Kirsten Eisenträger; William A. Stein; Bianca Viray
- Website: math.mit.edu/~poonen/

Bjorn Mikhail Poonen (born July 27, 1968, in Boston, Massachusetts) is a mathematician, four-time Putnam Competition winner, and a Distinguished Professor in Science in the Department of Mathematics at the Massachusetts Institute of Technology. His research is primarily in arithmetic geometry, but he has occasionally published in other subjects such as probability and computer science. He has edited two books.

He is the founding managing editor of the journal Algebra & Number Theory, and serves also on the editorial boards of Involve: A Journal of Mathematics and the A K Peters Research Notes in Mathematics book series.

== Early life and education ==
Poonen was born on July 27, 1968, in Boston to an Indian father and Norwegian-American mother. He attended the Hampshire College Summer Studies in Mathematics while a student at Winchester High School in Winchester, Massachusetts, where he graduated in 1985. In 1989, Poonen graduated from Harvard University with an A.B. in Mathematics and Physics, summa cum laude. He then studied under Kenneth Alan Ribet at the University of California, Berkeley, completing a PhD there in 1994.

== Academic positions ==
Poonen held postdoctoral positions at Mathematical Sciences Research Institute and Princeton University and served on the faculty of the University of California, Berkeley from 1997 to 2008, before moving to MIT. He has also held visiting positions at the Isaac Newton Institute (1998 and 2005), the Université Paris-Sud (2001), Harvard (2007), and MIT (2007).

== Major honors and awards ==
- Joseph L. Doob Prize, 2023
- Fellow of the American Mathematical Society, 2012.
- American Academy of Arts and Sciences: elected in 2012
- Chauvenet Prize: the 2011 winner, for his article "Undecidability in number theory"
- Miller Research Professorship – University of California Berkeley.
- David and Lucile Packard Fellowship
- Sloan Research Fellowship
- William Lowell Putnam Mathematical Competition: winner in 1985, 1986, 1987, and 1988 (the only other four-time winners since 1938 are Don Coppersmith, Arthur Rubin, Ravi D. Vakil, Gabriel Carroll, Reid W. Barton, Daniel Kane and Brian R. Lawrence).
- International Mathematical Olympiad: silver medalist in 1985.
- American High School Mathematics Examination: only participant (out of 380,000) to receive a perfect score in 1985.

== Trivia ==
- Poonen co-authored a paper entitled "How to spread rumors fast".
