= Ömer Cerrahoğlu =

Romanian IMO Medalist

- Born: 3 May 1995 (age 30); Istanbul, Turkey
- Citizenship: Turkey; Romania
- Known for: Third-youngest gold medalist in IMO history

Ömer Cerrahoğlu (born 3 May 1995) is a Romanian IMO Gold medalist in mathematics. At the age of 14 years, 80 days, he won a gold medal at the 2009 International Mathematical Olympiad, making him the third-youngest gold medalist in IMO history, behind Terence Tao and Raúl Chávez Sarmiento.

== Early life and education ==
He was born in Istanbul, Turkey to a Romanian mother and a Turkish father and when he was five years old, he moved with his family to Baia Mare, Romania. He graduated from the Massachusetts Institute of Technology (MIT) in June 2018, where he studied computer science.

== Career ==
In 2017, he participated in the 78th William Lowell Putnam Mathematical Competition as a student of MIT and earned a Putnam Fellowship. Since his Gold Medal in 2009, he won three silver medals at the 2010, 2011 and 2013 IMO's missing the gold by only 1, 2 and 1 points, respectively, and one more gold medal at the IMO 2012 in Argentina.

== See also ==
- List of International Mathematical Olympiad participants
