= Eisenträger =

Eisenträger or Eisentrager is a surname. Notable people with this name include:

- Alois Eisenträger (1927–2017), a German footballer
- Kirsten Eisenträger, an American mathematician
- Stian Eisenträger, a Norwegian journalist
- Thor Eisentrager, an American musician

== See also ==
- Johnson v. Eisenträger, a major U.S. Supreme Court case decided in 1950
