= Evan O'Dorney =

Scripps National Spelling Bee winner

- Born: September 16, 1993 (age 32); Seattle, Washington, U.S.
- Education: Harvard University (BA); Churchill College, Cambridge; Princeton University (PhD)
- Known for: Scripps National Spelling Bee; Intel Science Talent Search
- Scientific career
- Thesis: Reflection theorems for number rings (2021)
- Doctoral advisor: Manjul Bhargava

Evan Michael O'Dorney (born September 16, 1993) is an American mathematician who is a postdoctoral associate at Carnegie Mellon University. His specialization is number theory. As a home-schooled high school student and college student, he won many contests in mathematics and other subjects, including the 2007 Scripps National Spelling Bee, 2011 Intel Science Talent Search, four International Math Olympiad medals, and three Putnam Fellowships. A 2013 report by the National Research Council called him "as famous for academic excellence as any student can be".

== Education and competitions ==
O'Dorney grew up in Danville, California. When he was a child, he was assessed as "'profoundly gifted' with autistic behaviors", but he has never been formally diagnosed with a neurodevelopmental disorder. As a home-schooled high school student, he attended classes at the University of California, Berkeley from 2007 to 2011. He was the winner of the 2007 Scripps National Spelling Bee; an interview on CNN with Kiran Chetry after his win, in which he misspelled scombridae due to the interviewer's pronunciation, later became a viral video. During this time he was a four-time International Math Olympiad medalist, with two gold and two silver medals.

In 2010, he won $10,000 (half for himself and half for the Berkeley Mathematics Circle) in a national "Who Wants to Be a Mathematician" contest, held at that year's Joint Mathematics Meetings in San Francisco. In 2011, he won the top prize in the Intel Science Talent Search for a project entitled "continued fraction convergents and linear fractional transformations".

O'Dorney started attending Harvard College in 2011, where he studied mathematics. He enrolled in graduate classes in mathematics, skipping the undergraduate-level classes. While at Harvard, he was a three-time Putnam fellow. (His first Putnam was as a high school student.) After graduating summa cum laude, in 2015–16 he studied Part III of the Mathematical Tripos at Cambridge, on a Churchill Scholarship. In 2016 he received honorable mention for the Morgan Prize in mathematics.

In 2021, he earned a PhD in mathematics from Princeton University, with a dissertation titled "Reflection theorems for number rings".

== Career ==
He held a two-year post-doctoral position at the University of Notre Dame and then took up a similar appointment at Carnegie Mellon University. His specialization is number theory.

== Other interests ==
Although his primary interest is mathematics, O'Dorney has had a strong interest in music. In 2007, he composed a song to help memorize the digits of π. At Harvard, he studied music as well as mathematics, and continued to compose music, as well as singing in a chamber music group and playing the organ and piano. He has absolute pitch. O’Dorney finds spirituality in his mathematical studies, and his meeting with Eric Riedl at a Catholic Mass led him to Notre Dame.
