= List of International Mathematical Olympiad participants =

The International Mathematical Olympiad (IMO) is an annual international high school mathematics competition focused primarily on pre-collegiate mathematics, and is the oldest of the international science olympiads. The awards for exceptional performance include medals for roughly the top half participants, and honorable mentions for participants whom solve at least one problem perfectly.

This is a list of participants who have achieved notability. This includes participants that went on to become notable mathematicians, participants who won medals at an exceptionally young age, or participants who scored highly.

== Exceptionally young medalists ==
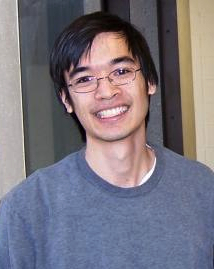
Terence Tao is the youngest bronze, silver, and gold medalist, respectively, in IMO history.

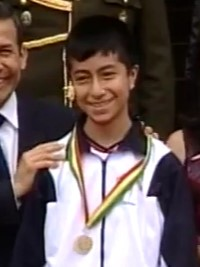
Raúl Chávez (Peru) is the second youngest bronze medalist and was also the same in silver and gold until 2020 and 2021, respectively.

Name	Team(s)	Year	Awards	Age (on final day of IMO)
Terence Tao	Australia	1986	Bronze	10 years, 363 days
Raúl Chávez Sarmiento	Peru	2009	Bronze	11 years, 271 days
Terence Tao	Australia	1987	Silver	11 years, 364 days
Alex Chui	Hong Kong	2020	Silver	12 years, 156 days
Akshay Venkatesh	Australia	1994	Bronze	12 years, 241 days
Yeoh Zi Song	Malaysia	2014	Bronze	12 years, 245 days
Raúl Chávez Sarmiento	Peru	2010	Silver	12 years, 263 days
Terence Tao	Australia	1988	Gold	13 years, 4 days
Warren Bei	Canada	2021	Silver	13 years, 78 days
Alex Chui	Hong Kong	2021	Gold	13 years, 90 days
Zhuo Qun Song	Canada	2010	Bronze	13 years, 170 days
Damjan Davkov	North Macedonia	2021	Silver	13 years, 199 days
Arlan Sayat	Kyrgyzstan	2025	Bronze	13 years, 242 days
Jeremy Kahn	United States	1983	Silver	13 years, 259 days
Raúl Chávez Sarmiento	Peru	2011	Gold	13 years, 273 days
Pawel Kröger	East Germany	1972	Perfect Score	13 years, 354 days
Pasin Manurangsi	Thailand	2007	Silver	13 years, 359 days
Warren Bei	Canada	2022	Gold	14 years, 66 days
Ömer Cerrahoğlu	Romania	2009	Gold	14 years, 80 days
Yi Shuen Yeoh	Malaysia	2025	Silver	14 years, 100 days
Pipitchaya Sridam	Thailand	2021	Gold	14 years, 136 days
Zhuo Qun Song	Canada	2011	Gold	14 years, 170 days
William Cheah	Australia	2023	Silver	14 years, 181 days
Damjan Davkov	North Macedonia	2022	Silver	14 years, 187 days
Janson Ho	Malaysia	2025	Silver	14 years, 188 days
Harvey Yau	United Kingdom	2014	Silver	14 years, 190 days
Jeremy Kahn	United States	1984	Silver	14 years, 258 days
Lisa Sauermann	Germany	2007	Silver	14 years, 309 days
Noam Elkies	United States	1981	Perfect Score	14 years, 329 days
Pasin Manurangsi	Thailand	2008	Gold	14 years, 351 days
Aleksandr Khazanov	United States	1994	Perfect Score	15 years, 77 days
Sergei Konyagin	Soviet Union	1972	Perfect Score	15 years, 83 days
Jacob Tsimerman	Canada	2003	Gold	15 years, 84 days
Ethan Yong-Ern Tan	Australia	2018	Gold	15 years, 125 days
Simon P. Norton	United Kingdom	1967	Gold	15 years, 135 days
Vladimir Drinfeld	Soviet Union	1969	Perfect Score	15 years, 156 days
Damjan Davkov	North Macedonia	2023	Gold	15 years, 184 days
Yuliy Sannikov	Ukraine	1994	Perfect Score	15 years, 259 days
Yang Yihan	Singapore	2024	Gold	15 years, 271 days

== High-scoring participants ==
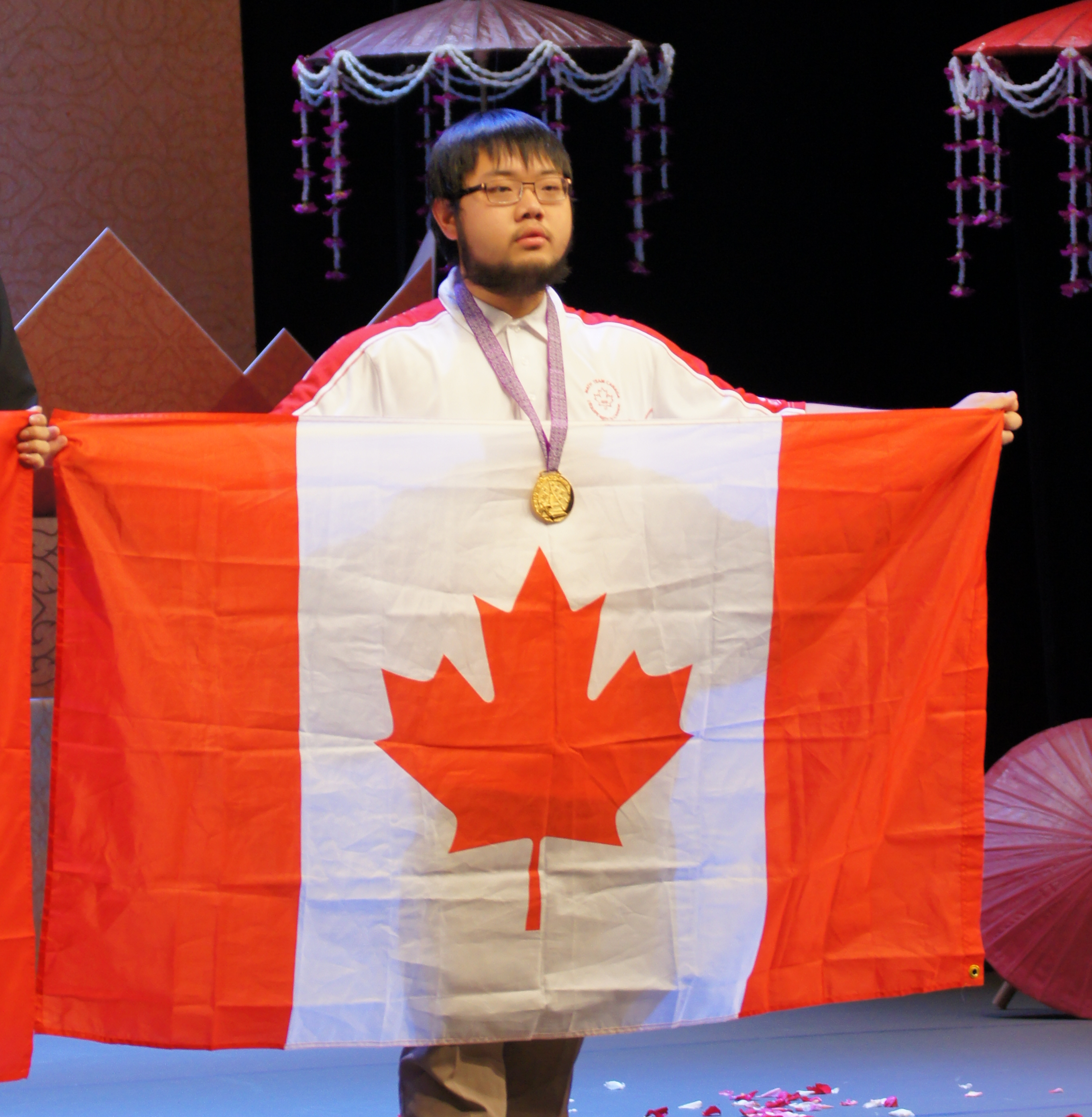
Zhuo Qun Song, the second most highly decorated IMO contestant with 5 golds and 1 bronze medal.

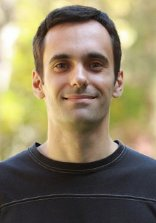
Ciprian Manolescu, the only person to achieve three perfect scores at the IMO (1995–1997).

The following table lists all IMO Winners who have won at least three gold medals, with corresponding years and non-gold medals received noted (P denotes a perfect score.)

Name	Team(s)	Years						
Alex Chui	Hong Kong ('20, '21); United Kingdom ('22, '23, '24, '25, '26)	2020	2021	2022	2023	2024	2025	2026 P
Zhuo Qun Song	Canada	2010	2011	2012	2013	2014	2015 P	
Teodor von Burg	Serbia	2007	2008	2009	2010	2011	2012	
Lisa Sauermann	Germany	2007	2008	2009	2010	2011 P		
Nipun Pitimanaaree	Thailand	2009	2010	2011	2012	2013		
Christian Reiher	Germany	1999	2000	2001	2002	2003		
Alexander Wang	United States	2023	2024	2025	2026 P			
Luke Robitaille	United States	2019	2020	2021	2022			
Reid W. Barton	United States	1998	1999	2000	2001 P			
Warren Bei	Canada	2021	2022	2023	2024	2025 P		
Wolfgang Burmeister	East Germany	1967	1968	1969	1970 P	1971		
Iurie Boreico	Moldova	2003	2004	2005 P	2006 P	2007		
Lim Jeck	Singapore	2009	2010	2011	2012 P	2013		
Martin Härterich	West Germany	1985	1986	1987 P	1988	1989		
László Lovász	Hungary	1963	1964	1965 P	1966 P			
József Pelikán	Hungary	1963	1964	1965	1966 P			
Nikolay Nikolov	Bulgaria	1992	1993	1994	1995 P			
Kentaro Nagao	Japan	1997	1998	1999	2000			
Vladimir Barzov	Bulgaria	1999	2000	2001	2002			
Peter Scholze	Germany	2004	2005 P	2006	2007			
Pranjal Srivastava	India	2018	2019	2021	2022			
Makoto Soejima	Japan	2005	2007	2008	2009 P			
Alex Gunning	Australia	2012	2013	2014 P	2015			
Andrew Carlotti	United Kingdom	2010	2011	2012	2013			
Simon Norton	United Kingdom	1967	1968	1969 P				
John Rickard	United Kingdom	1975 P	1976	1977 P				
Sergei Ivanov	Soviet Union	1987 P	1988	1989 P				
Theodor Banica	Romania	1989	1990	1991				
Eugenia Malinnikova	Soviet Union	1989	1990 P	1991 P				
Sergey Norin	Russia	1994 P	1995 P	1996				
Yuliy Sannikov	Ukraine	1994 P	1995	1996				
Ciprian Manolescu	Romania	1995 P	1996 P	1997 P				
Ivan Ivanov	Bulgaria	1996	1997	1998				
Nikolai Dourov	Russia	1996	1997	1998				
Tamás Terpai	Hungary	1997	1998	1999				
Stefan Hornet	Romania	1997	1998	1999				
Vladimir Dremov	Russia	1998	1999	2000				
Mihai Manea	Romania	1999	2000	2001				
Tiankai Liu	United States	2001	2002	2004				
Oleg Golberg	Russia ('02, '03); United States ('04)	2002	2003	2004				
Béla András Rácz	Hungary	2002	2003	2004 P				
Andrey Badzyan	Russia	2002	2003	2004 P				
Rosen Kralev	Bulgaria	2003	2004	2005 P				
Przemysław Mazur	Poland	2006	2007	2008				
Tak Wing Ching	Hong Kong	2009	2010	2011				
Chung Song Hong	North Korea	2011	2012	2013				
Dong Ryul Kim	South Korea	2012	2013	2014				
Allen Liu	United States	2014	2015	2016 P				
Sheldon Kieren Tan	Singapore	2014	2015	2016				
Pavel Ciurea	Romania	2023	2024	2025				
Yang Yihan	Singapore	2024	2025	2026				

== Notable participants ==
=== Mathematicians ===
A number of IMO participants have gone on to become notable mathematicians. The following IMO participants have either received a Fields Medal, an Abel Prize, a Wolf Prize or a Clay Research Award, awards which recognise groundbreaking research in mathematics; a European Mathematical Society Prize, an award which recognizes young researchers; or one of the American Mathematical Society's awards (a Blumenthal Award in Pure Mathematics, Bôcher Memorial Prize in Analysis, Cole Prize in Algebra, Cole Prize in Number Theory, Fulkerson Prize in Discrete Mathematics, Steele Prize in Mathematics, or Veblen Prize in Geometry and Topology) recognizing research in specific mathematical fields. Grigori Perelman proved the Poincaré conjecture (one of the seven Millennium Prize Problems), and Yuri Matiyasevich gave a negative solution of Hilbert's tenth problem.

G denotes an IMO gold medal, S denotes a silver medal, B denotes a bronze medal, and P denotes a perfect score.

Name	Team	IMO	Fields Medal	Wolf Prize	EMS Prize	AMS research prizes	Clay Award	Abel Prize
Grigory Margulis	Soviet Union	S 1962	1978	2005				2020
George Lusztig	Romania	S 1963, S 1962				1985 (Cole algebra)		
Henryk Iwaniec	Poland	S 1966, 1965				2002 (Cole number theory)		
László Lovász	Hungary	P 1966, P 1965, G 1964, S 1963		1999		1982, 2012 (Fulkerson)		2021
Andrei Suslin	Soviet Union	G 1967				2000 (Cole algebra)		
János Pintz	Hungary	B 1969, P 1968,B 1967				2014 (Cole number theory)		
Vladimir Drinfeld	Soviet Union	P 1969	1990	2018				
Andrei Zelevinsky	Soviet Union	S 1969				2018 (Steele)		
Alexander Merkurjev	Soviet Union	S 1972				2012 (Cole algebra)		
Pierre-Louis Lions	France	1973	1994					
János Kollár	Hungary	P 1974, G 1973				2006 (Cole algebra)		
Jean-Christophe Yoccoz	France	P 1974, S 1973	1994					
Sergey Fomin	Soviet Union	S 1974				2018 (Steele)		
Paul Vojta	United States	P 1975				1992 (Cole number theory)		
Alexander Goncharov	Soviet Union	G 1976			1992			
Richard Borcherds	United Kingdom	G 1978, S 1977	1998		1992			
Timothy Gowers	United Kingdom	P 1981	1998		1996			
Peter Kronheimer	United Kingdom	S 1981				2007 (Veblen)		
Michel Goemans	Belgium	1981, 1982				2000 (Fulkerson)		
Gábor Tardos	Hungary	S 1982, S 1981, 1979			1992			
Grigori Perelman	Soviet Union	P 1982	2006		1996			
Alexis Bonnet	France	S 1984, S 1983			1996			
Laurent Lafforgue	France	S 1985, S 1984	2002				2000	
Daniel Tătaru	Romania	P 1985, P 1984				2002 (Bôcher)		
Zoltán Szabó	Hungary	S 1985				2007 (Veblen)		
Jeremy Kahn	United States	G 1986, G 1985, S 1984, S 1983					2012	
Ricardo Pérez-Marco	Spain	S 1986, 1985			1996			
Dominic Joyce	United Kingdom	S 1986			2000			
Stanislav Smirnov	Soviet Union	P 1987, P 1986	2010		2004		2001	
Terence Tao	Australia	G 1988, S 1987, B 1986	2006			2002 (Bôcher)	2003	
Elon Lindenstrauss	Israel	B 1988	2010		2004	2001 (Blumenthal)		
Ngô Bảo Châu	Vietnam	G 1989, P 1988	2010				2004	
Emmanuel Grenier	France	B 1989			2000			
Vincent Lafforgue	France	P 1991, P 1990			2000			
Eugenia Malinnikova	Soviet Union	P 1991, P 1990, G 1989					2017	
Akshay Venkatesh	Australia	B 1994	2018					
Artur Avila	Brazil	G 1995	2014		2008			
Emmanuel Breuillard	France	G 1995			2012			
Ben J. Green	United Kingdom	S 1995, S 1994			2008		2004	
Maryam Mirzakhani	Iran	P 1995, G 1994	2014			2009 (Blumenthal)	2014	
Boáz Klartag	Israel	S 1996			2008			
Ciprian Manolescu	Romania	P 1997, P 1996, P 1995			2012			
Adrian Ioana	Romania	S 1999			2012			
Mark Braverman	Israel	G 2000, B 1999, B 1998			2016			
Ana Caraiani	Romania	G 2003, G 2002, S 2001			2020			
Kaisa Matomäki	Finland	2003, 2002			2020			
Jacob Tsimerman	Canada	P 2004, G 2003	2026					
Simion Filip	Moldova	S 2005, B 2004			2020			
Yu Deng	China	G 2006	2026				2026	
Peter Scholze	Germany	G 2007, G 2006, P 2005, S 2004	2018		2016	2015 (Cole algebra)	2014	

=== Computer scientists ===
IMO medalists have also gone on to become notable computer scientists. The following IMO medalists have received a IMU Abacus Medal (earlier known as Nevanlinna Prize), a Knuth Prize, or a Gödel Prize; these awards recognise research in theoretical computer science. G denotes an IMO gold medal, S denotes a silver medal, B denotes a bronze medal, and P denotes a perfect score.

Name	Team	IMO	IMU Abacus Medal	Knuth Prize	Gödel Prize
László Lovász	Hungary	P 1966, P 1965, G 1964, S 1963		1999	2001
László Babai	Hungary	P 1968, S 1967, S 1966		2015	1993
Johan Håstad	Sweden	G 1977			1994, 2011
Peter Shor	United States	S 1977	1998		1999
Alexander Razborov	Soviet Union	G 1979	1990		2007
Subhash Khot	India	S 1995, S 1994	2014		

=== Other ===
IMO medalists who have gone on to have notable careers in other fields or professions which aren't mathematics or computer science. G denotes an IMO gold medal, S denotes a silver medal, B denotes a bronze medal, and P denotes a perfect score.

Name	Team	IMO	Accomplishments
Nicușor Dan	Romania	P 1987, P 1988	Mayor of Bucharest (2020–2025), President of Romania (2025–present)
David Chalmers	Australia	B 1982	Notable philosopher and cognitive scientist

== See also ==
- Provincial Mathematical Olympiad
- List of mathematics competitions
- List of International Mathematical Olympiads
