= Alison Miller =

American mathematician

- Born: Alison Beth Miller
- Awards: Elizabeth Lowell Putnam Prize (2005) (2006) (2007)
- Scientific career
- Fields: Mathematics
- Thesis: Counting Simple Knots via Arithmetic Invariants (2014)
- Doctoral advisor: Manjul Bhargava

Alison Beth Miller is an American mathematician who was the first American female gold medalist at the International Mathematical Olympiad. She also holds the distinction of placing in the top 16 of the Putnam Competition four times, the last three of which were recognized by the Elizabeth Lowell Putnam award for outstanding performance by a woman on the contest.

== Early life, education and career ==
Miller was home-schooled in Niskayuna, New York, and in 2000 came in third place in the Scripps Howard National Spelling Bee. She competed for the U.S. in the International Mathematical Olympiad in 2004, where she became the first American female gold medalist.

As an undergraduate, she studied mathematics at Harvard University. She won the Elizabeth Lowell Putnam award for outstanding performance by a woman in the Putnam Competition in 2005, 2006, and 2007, matching the record set ten years earlier by Ioana Dumitriu. She coached American girls participating in the China Girls Mathematical Olympiad in 2007, the first year that the U.S. was represented in that Olympiad.

In 2008, she became a co-winner of the Alice T. Schafer Prize for excellence in mathematics by an undergraduate woman from the Association for Women in Mathematics for her three undergraduate research papers. That year she also received her B.A. degree with Highest Honors in Mathematics from Harvard University. Her senior thesis, for which she won the Hoopes Prize, was titled "Explicit Class Field Theory in Function Fields: Gross-Stark Units and Drinfeld Modules." She was then awarded a Churchill Scholarship to study for a year at the University of Cambridge in England.

She earned her Ph.D. from Princeton University in 2014, under the supervision of Manjul Bhargava; her dissertation concerned knot invariants. After graduation, she was a postdoctoral researcher at Harvard University before becoming an associate editor for Mathematical Reviews.

She should not be confused with Allison N. Miller, a mathematician at Swarthmore College.
