= Aleksandr Khazanov =

Missing Russian-American mathematician

- Khazanov in 1995
- Born: Aleksandr Leonidovich Khazanov; May 4, 1979; Leningrad, Russian SFSR, USSR
- Disappeared: June 10, 2001 (aged 22); Ocean Parkway, Brooklyn, New York, United States
- Status: Missing for 25 years, 5 months and 19 days
- Education: Penn State University
- Father: Leonid Khazanov

Aleksandr Leonidovich Khazanov (May 4, 1979 – disappeared June 10, 2001) is a Russian American mathematician. A child prodigy, he wrote a perfect paper at the International Mathematical Olympiad 1994, one of the youngest ever to do so. Khazanov was reported missing in June 2001. He suffered from depression or bipolar disorder at the time of his disappearance.

== Biography ==
Born to Anna and Leonid Khazanov, a math professor, Aleksandr had attended a special school for math students several years older in Leningrad, Soviet Union (now Saint Petersburg, Russia), before his family fled antisemitic threats and moved to Brooklyn, New York, United States as refugees in 1992. He attended Stuyvesant High School and showed his exceptional talent in mathematics. In the summer of 1994, he passed qualifying exams for Penn State University's doctoral program in math, and he was the youngest member on the United States team for the International Mathematical Olympiad of which all six members received perfect scores. In the following year, he was named a finalist and eventually placed 7th at the 54th Westinghouse Science Talent Search for a paper dealing with a variant of Fermat's Last Theorem, mentored by Leonid Vaserstein, a math professor at Penn State University, and also from Russia. He represented the United States for the second time in the 1995 International Mathematical Olympiad, and he entered the PhD math program at Penn State University right after high school in fall 1995.

== Disappearance ==
In the morning of June 10, 2001, he left home with his mountain bike and went missing, leaving a note in Russian saying "I went to a library." He was taking a semester leave due to personal problems, and had been taking drugs for depression, but he did not bring them when he left home.

== See also ==
- List of people who disappeared mysteriously (2000–present)
- List of International Mathematical Olympiad participants
