= Zhuo Qun Song =

Canadian IMO contestant (born 1997)

- 宋卓群
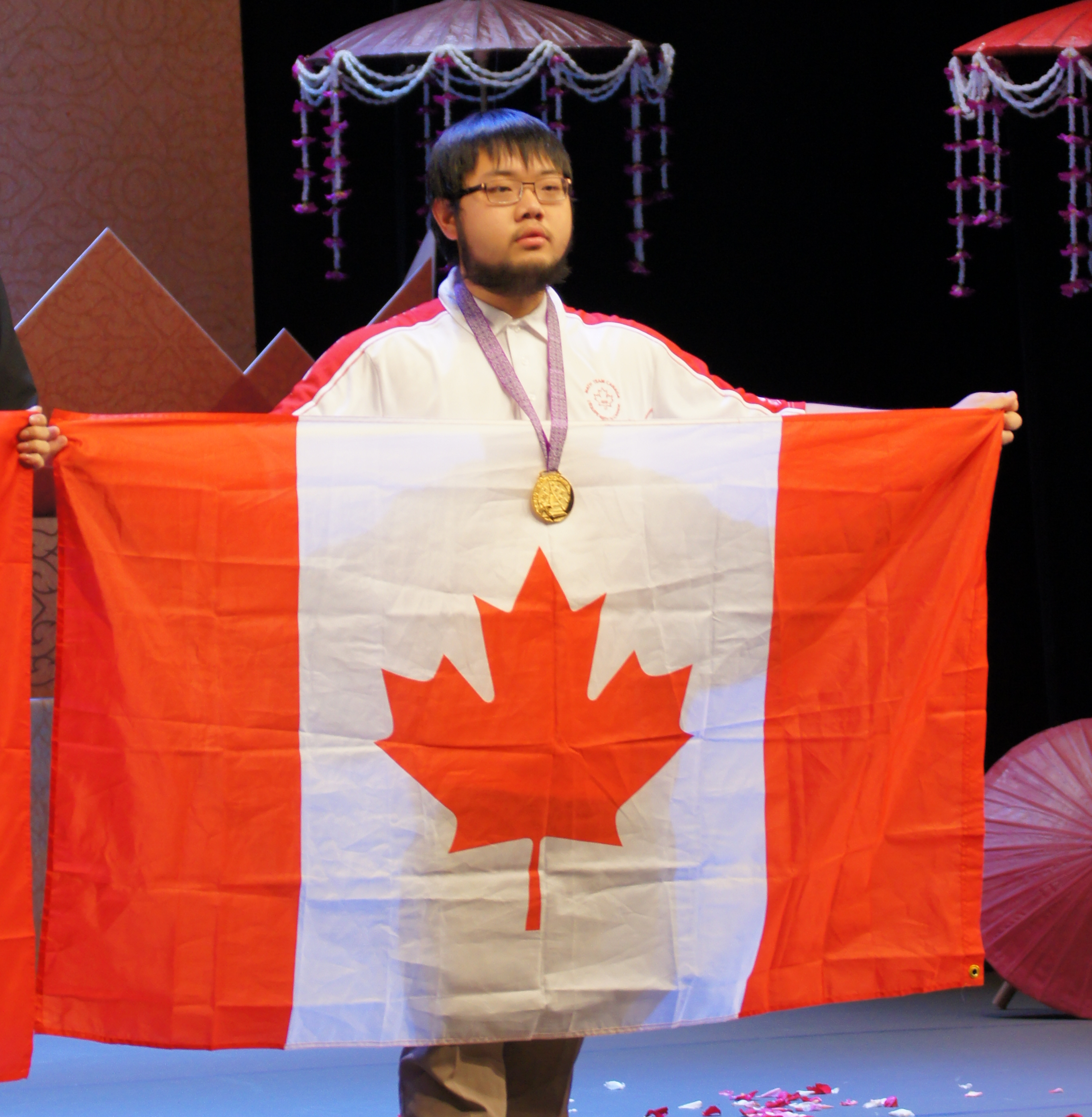
- Song in 2015
- Born: 1997 (age 28–29); Tianjin, China
- Other name: Alex
- Education: Princeton University; University of Illinois Urbana-Champaign
- Known for: Most highly decorated IMO contestant from 2015 to 2026

Zhuo Qun Song
- Chinese: 宋卓群
Transcriptions
Standard Mandarin
- Hanyu Pinyin: Sòng Zhuōqún
- IPA: [sʊ̂ŋ ʈʂwó.tɕʰy̌n]

Zhuo Qun Song (Chinese: 宋卓群; pinyin: Sòng Zhuōqún; born 1997), also called Alex Song, is a Canadian who was from 2015 to 2026, the most highly decorated International Mathematical Olympiad (IMO) contestant, with five gold medals and one bronze medal. He was surpassed by Alex Chui in July 2026.

== Early life ==
Song was born in Tianjin, China in 1997. He and his parents moved to Canada in 2002. Song was brought up in Waterloo, Ontario.

Song was interested in mathematics at a very young age where he started participating in competitions in Grade 1. By Grade 4, Song was participating in competitions such as the Canadian Open Mathematics Challenge and the American Mathematics Competitions. In Grade 5, Song became interested in solving Olympiad type questions and started training to solve them.

In 2011, Song moved to the United States to attend Phillips Exeter Academy.

== International Mathematical Olympiad ==
In 2010, when Song was in the seventh grade, he represented Vincent Massey Secondary School in the Canadian Mathematical Olympiad where he finished first place.

In the same year, Song represented Canada in the 2010 IMO where he won a bronze medal. He would continue to represent Canada for 5 subsequent IMOs where he obtained a gold medal each time. He obtained a perfect score on his final run in 2015, the only contestant to do so that year. The performances made Song the most decorated contestant of all time until 2026. In 2015, Song was also one of the twelve top scorers of the United States of America Mathematical Olympiad, representing Phillips Exeter Academy.

=== Results ===
Year	Venue	Result
2015	(Thailand) Chiang Mai	Gold medal (P)
2014	(South Africa) Cape Town	Gold medal
2013	(Colombia) Santa Marta	Gold medal
2012	(Argentina) Mar del Plata	Gold medal
2011	(Netherlands) Amsterdam	Gold medal
2010	(Kazakhstan) Astana	Bronze medal

== Post-IMO ==
Song graduated from Phillips Exeter Academy in 2015.

Song attended Princeton University where he graduated in 2019 with a Bachelor of Arts in Mathematics.

During his time at Princeton, Song was part of the team that participated in the Putnam Competition. His team won second place in 2016 and third place in 2017.

Song interned as a trader at Jane Street Capital during the summers of 2017 and 2018. Song was previously a Quantitative Researcher at Citadel LLC. As of 2022, he is a graduate student at the University of Illinois Urbana–Champaign. He also has been lead coach for the Canadian IMO team since 2020.

== See also ==
- List of International Mathematical Olympiad participants
