= Pan-African Mathematics Olympiads =

Mathematics olympiad

The Pan-African Mathematics Olympiads (P.A.M.O.) are the African version of the IMO, International Mathematical Olympiad.

== Description ==
This event organized each year by the African Mathematics Union (AMU) is a competition among the best pupils in Mathematics of Secondary Education who are less than twenty (20) years old.

== History ==
The first PAMO was organized in 1987.

== Recent Editions ==
Event editions

== Previous Editions ==
Edition	Year	Organizer Country	City	Number of Countries	Number of Contestants	Number of Unofficial Contestants
32	2025	Botswana	Gaborone	20	110	12
31	2024	South Africa	Johannesburg	27	142	11
30	2023	Rwanda	Kigali	33	178	14
29	2022	Morocco	Ben Guerir	11	49	13
28	2021	Tunisia	Sousse	11		
27	2019	South Africa	Cape Town	11		
26	2018	Kenya	Nairobi	9	43	1
25	2017	Morocco	Rabat	10	46	3
24	2016	Senegal	Dakar	8	45	8
23	2015	Nigeria	Abuja	9		
22	2013	Nigeria	Abuja	11	42	15
21	2012	Tunisia	Tunis	9	28	12
20	2010	Ivory Coast	Yamoussoukro	9	34	8
19	2009	South Africa	Pretoria	13	48	9
18	2008	Benin	Cotonou	11	38	11
17	2007	Nigeria	Lagos	9	32	6
16	2006	Senegal	Dakar	11	42	
15	2005	Algeria	Algiers	8	32	
14	2004	Tunisia	Tunis	11	40	
13	2003	Mozambique	Maputo	12		
12	2002	South Africa	Pretoria	12		
11	2001	Burkina Faso	Ouagadougou	8		
10	2000	South Africa	Cape Town	7		
9	1998	Morocco	Rabat	6		
8	1997	Benin	Cotonou	4		
7	1996	Uganda (Canceled)				
6	1995	Morocco	Ifrane	6		
5	1994	Ivory Coast	Yamoussoukro	3		
4	1993	Senegal	Dakar	4		
3	1991	Kenya	Nairobi	3		
2	1989	Nigeria	Ibadan	9		
1	1987	Morocco	Rabat	7		

== Format ==
The competition is made of two rounds. Each round is made of 3 problems for four hours and thirty minutes while each problem's total score is 7 points. There are up to six candidates per country.

== Results published by each country ==
Country	Results
South Africa	Results
