= Forsvarets forum =

Norwegian magazine

- Type: Magazine
- Owner(s): Norwegian Armed Forces
- Editor: Stian Eisenträger
- Founded: 1945
- Headquarters: Oslo and Bardufoss, Norway
- Website: www.forsvaretsforum.no

Forsvarets forum ("Defense Forum", or more literally "Forum of the [Norwegian] Defense Forces"; formerly Mannskapsavisa og Forsvarsforum) is an independently edited magazine published by the Norwegian Armed Forces that covers the armed forces as well as defense and security policy. It was founded in 1945 and is headquartered at Akershus Fortress, with a smaller office at Bardufoss. The printed magazine is published six times annually. In 2018 the magazine received the award "trade magazine of the year." As of 2010 the magazine had a circulation of 85,000. As of 2018 the printed magazine had a circulation of around 65,000. Forsvarets forum also publishes the podcast "Krig & Sånn." The editor-in-chef is Stian Eisenträger.
