= Ciprian Manolescu =

Romanian-American mathematician

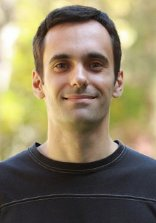
- Born: December 24, 1978 (age 47); Alexandria, Romania
- Education: Harvard University (BA 2001; PhD 2004)
- Known for: Hauptvermutung; Seiberg–Witten Floer theory
- Awards: E. H. Moore Prize (2019); EMS Prize (2012); Morgan Prize (2002); Putnam Fellow (1997, 1998, 2000)
- Scientific career
- Fields: Mathematics
- Workplaces: Stanford University; UCLA; Columbia University; Clay Mathematics Institute; Institute for Advanced Study
- Thesis: A spectrum valued TQFT from the Seiberg-Witten equations (2004)
- Doctoral advisor: Peter B. Kronheimer
- Website: web.stanford.edu/~cm5/

Ciprian Manolescu (Romanian pronunciation: [tʃipriˈan manoˈlesku]; born December 24, 1978) is a Romanian-American mathematician, working in gauge theory, symplectic geometry, and low-dimensional topology. He is a professor of mathematics at Stanford University.

== Biography ==
Manolescu completed his first eight classes at School no. 11 Mihai Eminescu and his secondary education at Ion Brătianu High School in Pitești. He completed his undergraduate studies and PhD at Harvard University under the direction of Peter B. Kronheimer. He was the winner of the Morgan Prize, awarded jointly by AMS-MAA-SIAM, in 2002. His undergraduate thesis was on Finite dimensional approximation in Seiberg–Witten theory, and his PhD thesis topic was A spectrum valued TQFT from the Seiberg–Witten equations.

In early 2013, he released a paper detailing a disproof of the triangulation conjecture for manifolds of dimension 5 and higher. For this paper, he received the E. H. Moore Prize from the American Mathematical Society.

== Awards and honors ==
He was among the recipients of the Clay Research Fellowship (2004–2008).

In 2012, he was awarded one of the ten prizes of the European Mathematical Society for his work on low-dimensional topology, and particularly for his role in the development of combinatorial Heegaard Floer homology.

He was elected as a member of the 2017 class of Fellows of the American Mathematical Society "for contributions to Floer homology and the topology of manifolds".

In 2018, he was an invited speaker at the International Congress of Mathematicians (ICM) in Rio de Janeiro.

In 2020, he received a Simons Investigator Award. The citation reads: "Ciprian Manolescu works in low-dimensional topology and gauge theory. His research is centered on constructing new versions of Floer homology and applying them to questions in topology. With collaborators, he showed that many Floer-theoretic invariants are algorithmically computable. He also developed a new variant of Seiberg-Witten Floer homology, which he used to prove the existence of non-triangulable manifolds in high dimensions."

== Competitions ==
He has one of the best records ever in mathematical competitions:

- He holds the sole distinction of writing three perfect papers at the International Mathematical Olympiad: Toronto, Canada (1995); Bombay, India (1996); Mar del Plata, Argentina (1997).
- Manolescu is a three-time Putnam Fellow, having placed in the top five in the William Lowell Putnam Mathematical Competition in 1997, 1998, and 2000.

== Selected works ==
- Manolescu, Ciprian (2016). "Pin(2)-equivariant Seiberg–Witten Floer homology and the Triangulation Conjecture". J. Amer. Math. Soc. 29: 147–176. arXiv:1303.2354. doi:10.1090/jams829. S2CID 16403004.
- Manolescu, Ciprian; Ozsváth, Peter; Sarkar, Sucharit (2009). "A Combinatorial Description of Knot Floer Homology". Annals of Mathematics. Second Series. 169 (2): 633–660. arXiv:math/0607691. doi:10.4007/annals.2009.169.633. S2CID 15427272.
- Lipshitz, Robert; Manolescu, Ciprian; Wang, Jiajun (2008). "Combinatorial cobordism maps in hat Heegaard Floer theory". Duke Math. J. 145 (2): 207–247. arXiv:math/0611927. doi:10.1215/00127094-2008-050. S2CID 15351034.
