= List of countries by medal count at International Mathematical Olympiad =

The following is the ranked list of the top 50 countries by medal count at the International Mathematical Olympiad:

== Detail ==
Rank	Country	Gold	Silver	Bronze	Honorable mentions	Gold in Last 10 contests (updated till 2026)
1	China	197	37	6	0	55
2	United States	160	122	31	1	44
3	Russia	110	64	12	0	19
4	South Korea	102	87	28	8	38
5	Hungary	91	178	121	10	12
6	Romania	89	164	114	7	14
7	Vietnam	73	123	87	3	18
8	United Kingdom	61	126	136	18	18
9	Bulgaria	58	135	127	15	6
10	Germany	55	118	98	16	6
11	Iran	55	117	54	5	14
12	Japan	53	101	56	6	16
13	Taiwan	49	110	41	9	13
14	Ukraine	45	79	63	11	12
15	Canada	45	76	100	21	14
16	Poland	39	102	147	28	12
17	Thailand	36	73	59	27	18
18	Australia	32	82	106	22	14
19	Singapore	31	78	76	23	16
20	France	28	79	132	30	5
21	Israel	27	70	112	23	14
22	Turkey	25	80	98	15	8
23	India	25	80	80	29	14
24	Italy	25	57	85	35	12
25	North Korea	24	38	11	2	5
26	Belarus	20	62	94	18	6
27	Serbia	18	41	44	20	8
28	Hong Kong	16	73	96	25	6
29	Kazakhstan	16	54	82	29	2
30	Brazil	15	66	94	36	6
31	Austria	14	43	116	67	1
32	Netherlands	11	35	102	57	4
33	Slovakia	9	42	97	38	4
34	Mongolia	9	37	87	57	7
35	Peru	7	48	67	36	2
36	Czech Republic	7	44	84	48	3
37	Sweden	7	36	96	68	2
38	Georgia	7	24	85	61	5
39	Malaysia	7	23	39	44	4
40	Mexico	6	37	89	42	3
41	Croatia	6	30	91	47	1
42	Indonesia	6	30	69	40	5
43	Argentina	6	29	76	57	2
44	Switzerland	6	15	67	50	5
45	Greece	5	36	89	66	3
46	Moldova	5	27	63	56	0
47	Bosnia and Herzegovina	5	16	66	63	5
48	Philippines	4	22	46	34	2
49	North Macedonia	4	10	55	55	4
50	Norway	3	15	48	60	1

== Ranked Table ==
International Mathematical Olympiad medal table
Rank	Nation	Gold	Silver	Bronze	Total
1	China (CHN)	191	37	6	234
2	United States (USA)	156	121	30	307
3	Russia (RUS)	106	62	12	180
4	South Korea (KOR)	99	85	28	212
5	Hungary (HUN)	90	177	117	384
6	Romania (ROU)	88	161	112	361
7	Vietnam (VNM)	71	120	86	277
8	Great Britain (GBR)	59	125	133	317
9	Bulgaria (BGR)	57	133	124	314
10	Germany (DEU)	54	116	95	265
11	Iran (IRN)	53	116	51	220
12	Japan (JPN)	51	100	53	204
13	Taiwan (TWN)	48	107	39	194
14	Ukraine (UKR)	44	77	61	182
15	Canada (CAN)	44	73	98	215
16	Poland (POL)	37	101	144	282
17	Thailand (THA)	35	72	55	162
18	Australia (AUS)	31	80	104	215
19	Singapore (SGP)	28	76	75	179
20	France (FRA)	28	74	131	233
21	Israel (ISR)	26	69	108	203
22	Turkey (TUR)	24	77	96	197
23	Italy (ITA)	24	56	82	162
24	India (IND)	23	76	80	179
25	North Korea (PRK)	22	36	9	67
26	Belarus (BLR)	20	62	88	170
27	Hong Kong (HKG)	16	69	94	179
28	Kazakhstan (KAZ)	16	51	79	146
29	Serbia (SRB)	16	39	41	96
30	Brazil (BRA)	15	61	93	169
31	Austria (AUT)	14	41	115	170
32	Netherlands (NLD)	11	35	100	146
33	Mongolia (MNG)	9	35	83	127
34	Peru (PER)	7	45	65	117
35	Slovakia (SVK)	7	42	93	142
36	Czech Republic (CZE)	7	40	83	130
37	Sweden (SWE)	7	36	92	135
38	Yugoslavia (YUG)	6	46	96	148
39	Mexico (MEX)	6	37	84	127
40	Croatia (HRV)	6	30	88	124
41	Indonesia (IDN)	6	30	65	101
42	Argentina (ARG)	6	29	72	107
43	Georgia (GEO)	6	23	83	112
44	Malaysia (MYS)	6	20	38	64
45	Greece (GRC)	5	35	87	127
46	Moldova (MDA)	5	17	33	55
Totals (46 entries)		1,686	3,150	3,601	8,437
