= Alex Chui =

Brtish IMO contestant (born 2008)

Alex Chui Tsz Fung
- Born: 2008 (age 17–18); Hong Kong
- Education: University of Cambridge
- Known for: Most decorated IMO contestant with 5 golds and 2 silver medals

Chinese name
- Traditional Chinese: 徐子豐
- Simplified Chinese: 徐子豐
Transcriptions
Standard Mandarin
- Hanyu Pinyin: Xú Zǐ Fēng
Yue: Cantonese
- Yale Romanization: Cheui Ji2 Fung1
- Jyutping: Ceoi4 Zi2 Fung1

Alex Chui Tsz Fung (Chinese: 徐子豐; Cantonese Yale: Cheui Ji2 Fung1; born 2008), is a Hong Kong-born British student who is currently the most decorated International Mathematical Olympiad (IMO) contestant since July 2026, with five gold medals and two silver medals. He represented Hong Kong and later represented the United Kingdom. He is the first and only competitor to ever win seven medals consecutively at the IMO.

== Early life and education ==
Chui was born to a family of four. He has an older brother. At age 7, Chui took an IQ test scoring 144. Around this age he attended the gifted student program at the Chinese University of Hong Kong for the first time and skipped some of the more advanced math courses.

Chui attended Ma Tau Chung Government Primary School. In 2017, he passed the assessment of the Hong Kong Academy for Gifted Education to become a student there. He participated in the selection process for the Hong Kong Mathematics Olympiad and became a reserve member of the team while being the only primary school student.

Despite Chui's aptitude, he went through a regular schooling process and did not skip any grades. After primary school, he attended Diocesan Boys' School.

During the COVID-19 pandemic, Chui represented Hong Kong at the IMO via online competition. In 2020, Chui participated in his first IMO competition winning a silver medal. This was followed by a gold medal in 2021.

In 2022 Chui moved to the United Kingdom to attend Tonbridge School. Up until July 2026, while representing the United Kingdom at the IMO, Chui obtained three golds medals and one silver medals with scores consistently ranging between 28 and 35 points. In July 2026, in his seventh and final appearance at the IMO in Shanghai, China, Chui obtained a gold medal with a perfect score of 42. With this Chui become the most decorated IMO contestant of all time and the second to obtain five gold medals after Zhuo Qun Song.

Chui is currently studying mathematics at University of Cambridge.

== International Mathematical Olympiad ==
=== Results ===
Year	Representing	Venue	Result
2026	United Kingdom	Shanghai, China	Gold medal (P)
2025	United Kingdom	Sunshine Coast, Australia	Gold medal
2024	United Kingdom	Bath, United Kingdom	Gold medal
2023	United Kingdom	Chiba, Japan	Gold medal
2022	United Kingdom	Oslo, Norway	Silver medal
2021	Hong Kong	Online	Gold medal
2020	Hong Kong	Online	Silver medal

== See also ==
- List of International Mathematical Olympiad participants
