= Bianca Viray =

American mathematician (born 1983)

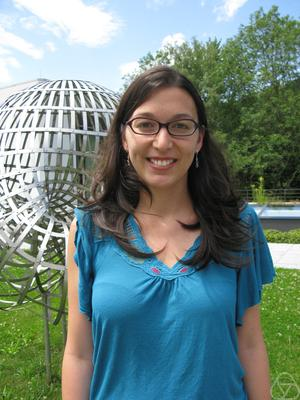
- Bianca Viray at Oberwolfach in 2011
- Born: 1983 (age 42–43)
- Education: BS, University of Maryland, 2005; PhD University of California, Berkeley, 2010
- Awards: AMS Joan and Joseph Birman Fellowship (2022 - 2023); Fellow, Association for Women in Mathematics (2022); Fellow, American Mathematical Society (2021); NSF CAREER Award (2016)
- Scientific career
- Fields: Mathematics
- Workplaces: University of Washington
- Thesis: The algebraic Brauer-Manin obstruction on Chatelet surfaces, degree 4 del Pezzo surfaces, and Enriques surfaces (2010)
- Doctoral advisor: Bjorn Poonen
- Website: sites.math.washington.edu/~bviray/

Bianca L. Viray (born 1983) is an American mathematician and professor at the University of Washington in Seattle. She works in arithmetic geometry, which is a blend of algebraic geometry and algebraic number theory.

== Education ==
Viray received a B.S. in mathematics (cum laude) from the University of Maryland in 2005. She received a Ph.D. in mathematics from the University of California, Berkeley in 2010; her thesis advisor was Bjorn Poonen. After receiving her degree, Viray became a Tamarkin Assistant Professor and National Science Foundation (NSF) Postdoc at Brown University; she was at Brown from 2010 to 2014.

== Career and recognition ==
Viray started at the University of Washington as an assistant professor in 2014 and was promoted to associate professor in 2017 and full professor in 2021. She serves on the Board of Girls' Angle, a math club and magazine for girls. She received an NSF CAREER Award in 2016. She was selected in fall 2017 to deliver the University of Oregon Distinguished Lecture for their Association for Women in Mathematics Student Chapter. She was selected as a Simons Fellow in mathematics in 2020. She was elected a Fellow of the American Mathematical Society in the class of 2021. Her citation was "for contributions to arithmetic geometry, in particular to the subject of rational points on varieties, and for sustained efforts to support underrepresented groups in mathematics". She was named to the 2022 class of Fellows of the Association for Women in Mathematics, "for her leadership and support of women and girls in math through her work on Girl’s Angle, the Women In Numbers research network, the Noetherian Ring, the Western Algebraic Geometry Symposium, and for launching new and impactful mentoring programs". Viray received the 2022-2023 American Mathematical Society Joan and Joseph Birman Fellowship, a fellowship "that gives exceptionally talented women extra research support during their mid-career years." She is a former American Mathematical Society Council member at large. She currently serves as the AMS Vice President.
