= Gabriel Carroll =

American mathematician

Gabriel D. Carroll
- Born: December 24, 1982 (age 43); Oakland, California
- Education: MIT; Harvard University
- Scientific career
- Fields: Mathematics; Mathematical economics
- Workplaces: University of Toronto; Microsoft Research
- Doctoral advisor: Parag Pathak; Daron Acemoglu

Gabriel Drew Carroll (born December 24, 1982) is a professor of economics at the University of Toronto. He was born to tech industry worker parents in Oakland. He graduated from Harvard University with B.A. in mathematics and linguistics in 2005 and received his doctorate in economics from MIT in 2012. He was recognized as a child prodigy and received numerous awards in mathematics while a student.

Carroll won two gold medals (1998, 2001) and a silver medal (1999) at the International Mathematical Olympiad (IMO), earning a perfect score at the 2001 International Mathematical Olympiad held in Washington, D.C., shared only with American teammate Reid W. Barton and Chinese teammates Liang Xiao and Zhiqiang Zhang.

Gabriel earned a place among the top five ranked competitors (who are themselves not ranked against each other) in the William Lowell Putnam Competition all four years that he was eligible (2000–2003), a feat matched by only eight others—Don Coppersmith (1968–1971), Arthur Rubin (1970–1973), Bjorn Poonen (1985–1988), Ravi Vakil (1988–1991), Reid W. Barton (2001–2004), Daniel Kane (2003–2006), Brian R. Lawrence (2007, 2008, 2010, 2011), and Luke Robitaille (2022–2025). His top-5 performance in 2000 was particularly notable, as he was officially taking the exam in spite of only being a high school senior, thus forfeiting one of his years of eligibility in college. He was on the first place Putnam team twice (2001–02) and the second place team once (2003).

He has earned awards in science and math, including the Intel Science Talent Search, has taught mathematics classes and tutorials, and plays the piano. He was a Research Science Institute scholar in 2000.

Carroll proposed Problem 3 of IMO 2009 and Problem 3 of IMO 2010. He also proposes problems to the USAMO such as problem 3 in 2007, 2008, 2010 and problem 6 in 2009.

During the 2005–06 academic year, he taught English in Chaling, Hunan, China. He worked at the National Bureau of Economic Research from 2006 to 2007 and was an assistant professor of economics, and then an associate professor of economics, at Stanford University from July 2013 through December 2020.

== Education ==
Gabriel Carroll is an alumnus of Oakland Technical High School and graduated from Harvard University in 2005 with degrees in Mathematics and Linguistics. He graduated from the Economics Department at MIT in 2012, and spent one year at Microsoft Research as a postdoctoral researcher during 2012–2013.

== Personal life ==
Carroll married Canadian economist Eva Vivalt in August 2019.
