= Stian Eisenträger =

Norwegian journalist

Stian Andre Ebbesvik Eisenträger (born 1984) is a Norwegian journalist and editor. Since August 2025, he has been the editor-in-chief of Sykepleien, a Norwegian publication covering nursing, healthcare and health policy.

He previously served as editor-in-chief and managing director of the Norwegian fact-checking organisation Faktisk.no from 2024 to 2025, and as editor-in-chief of Forsvarets forum, a Norwegian publication covering defence and security affairs, from 2020 to 2023. Before becoming an editor, he worked as a foreign affairs journalist at Verdens Gang (VG).

== Career ==
=== Early career and Verdens Gang ===
Eisenträger began his journalistic career at Forsvarets forum in 2003–2004 while completing his compulsory military service in the Norwegian Armed Forces.

From 2007 to 2020, he worked at Verdens Gang (VG), one of Norway's largest newspapers, primarily covering foreign affairs and international news. During this period, he also served as acting head of foreign news and as a news editor.

=== Forsvarets forum ===
In 2020, Eisenträger was appointed editor-in-chief of Forsvarets forum, returning to the publication where he had worked during his military service.

During his tenure, the publication strengthened its editorial independence, developed its digital journalism and expanded its investigative reporting. The publication's digital page views increased from 1.3 million in 2019 to 13.8 million in 2022.

In 2023, he received the Norwegian specialised press association's Editor of the Year award (Årets fagpresseredaktør) for his work at Forsvarets forum.

=== Faktisk.no ===
In January 2024, Eisenträger became editor-in-chief and managing director of Faktisk.no, a Norwegian fact-checking organisation established by several major Norwegian media companies.

In February 2025, it was announced that he would leave Faktisk.no to become editor-in-chief of Sykepleien.

=== Sykepleien ===
Eisenträger took up the position of editor-in-chief of Sykepleien in August 2025. The publication is owned by the Norwegian Nurses Organisation (Norsk Sykepleierforbund) and covers nursing, healthcare, research and health policy.

His appointment followed his previous leadership positions in specialised journalism and fact-checking.

== Other positions ==
In August 2025, Eisenträger was appointed chair of the board of Panorama nyheter, a Norwegian news publication specialising in international development and foreign affairs.

He has also participated in discussions concerning editorial independence and the responsibilities of editors in Norwegian specialised media. In May 2026, he addressed a public meeting organised by the Norwegian Press Association's committee on editorial responsibility.

== Education ==
Eisenträger holds a bachelor's degree in journalism and a master's degree in international relations.

== Awards ==
- 2018: International Reporter Prize (Internasjonal Reporter-prisen), awarded at the SKUP journalism conference, jointly with Ronny Berg and Espen Rasmussen for the VG reporting project Det hvite raseriet ("The White Rage").
- 2023: Editor of the Year in the Norwegian specialised press (Årets fagpresseredaktør), awarded by Fagpressen for his leadership of Forsvarets forum.
