= Kirsten Eisenträger =

German-American mathematician

Anne Kirsten Eisenträger is a professor of mathematics at The Pennsylvania State University, known for her research on computational number theory, Hilbert's tenth problem, and applications in cryptography.

Eisenträger earned a Vordiplom in mathematics in 1996 from the University of Tübingen and a Master's degree (1998) and a Ph.D. (2003) from the University of California, Berkeley; her dissertation, titled Hilbert’s Tenth Problem and Arithmetic Geometry, was supervised by Bjorn Poonen. After temporary positions at the Institute for Advanced Study and the University of Michigan, she joined the Pennsylvania State University faculty in 2007.

Eisenträger appears in George Csicsery's documentary film Julia Robinson and Hilbert's Tenth Problem (2008). In 2017, she became a Fellow of the American Mathematical Society "for contributions to computational number theory and number-theoretic undecidability".
