= Raúl Chávez Sarmiento =

Peruvian mathematician

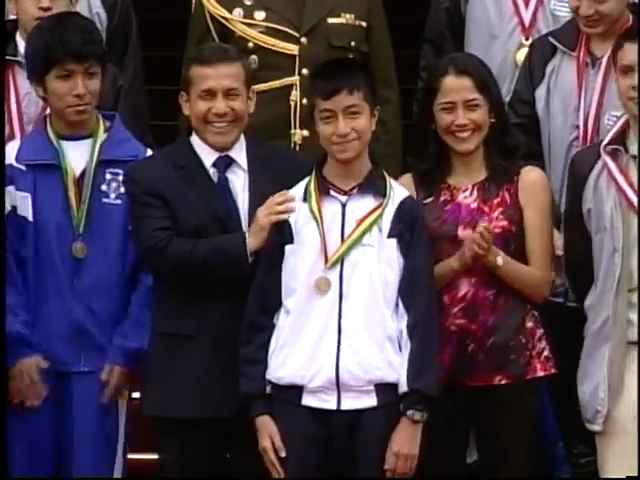
- Chávez, receiving an award by the President at the Government Palace of Peru
- Born: 24 October 1997 (age 28); Peru
- Education: Harvard University
- Known for: Second youngest bronze medalist in IMO history

Raúl Arturo Chávez Sarmiento (born 24 October 1997) is a Peruvian child prodigy in mathematics. At the age of 11 years, 271 days, he won a bronze medal at the 2009 International Mathematical Olympiad, making him the second youngest medalist in IMO history, behind Terence Tao, who won a bronze medal in 1986 at the age of 10.

He then won a silver medal at the 2010 IMO, a gold medal (6th ranked overall) at the 2011 IMO, and a silver medal again at the 2012 IMO.

Chávez Sarmiento received his Ph.D. in 2024 from Harvard University with the thesis The Hilbert-Chow algebra of a proper surface and Grojnowski calculus.

== See also ==
- List of child prodigies
- List of International Mathematical Olympiad participants
