= Putnam Competition =

Annual mathematics competition

The William Lowell Putnam Mathematical Competition, often truncated to Putnam Competition, is an annual mathematics competition for undergraduate college students enrolled at institutions of higher learning in the United States, Canada, and Mexico (regardless of the students' nationalities). It awards scholarships and cash prizes ranging from $250 to $2,500 to the top individual contestants and from $5,000 to $25,000 to the top-performing institutions. Each of the five highest-scoring contestants, known as Putnam Fellows, receives a Putnam Fellow Prize Fellowship, which provides a scholarship of up to $12,000 plus tuition for graduate studies at Harvard University. The names of the top 100 individual scorers are published alphabetically within rank in the American Mathematical Monthly, while the names and addresses of the top 500 contestants are sent to all participating institutions. It is widely considered to be the most prestigious university-level mathematics competition in the world; the median score is often zero or one (out of 120) despite being primarily attempted by students specializing in mathematics.

The competition was founded in 1927 by Elizabeth Lowell Putnam in memory of her husband William Lowell Putnam, who was an advocate of intercollegiate intellectual competition. The competition has been offered annually since 1938 and is administered by the Mathematical Association of America.

== Competition layout ==
The Putnam competition takes place on the first Saturday in December, and consists of two three-hour sittings separated by a lunch break. The competition is supervised by faculty members at the participating schools. Each one consists of twelve challenging problems. The problems cover a range of advanced material in undergraduate mathematics, including concepts from group theory, set theory, graph theory, lattice theory, and number theory.

Each of the twelve questions is worth 10 points, and the most frequent scores above zero are 10 points for a complete solution, 9 points for a nearly complete solution, and 1 point for the beginnings of a solution. In earlier years, the twelve questions were worth one point each, with no partial credit given. The competition is considered to be very difficult: it is typically attempted by students specializing in mathematics, but the median score is usually zero or one point out of 120 possible, and there have been only five perfect scores as of 2021. In 2003, of the 3,615 students competing, 1,024 (28%) scored 10 or more points, and 42 points was sufficient to make the top percentile. In 2024, 3,988 students competed with 1,273 (32%) scoring 10 or more points with 48 points were needed to rank 100.

At a participating college, any student who wishes to take part in the competition may (limited by the number of spots a school receives); but until 2019 the school's official team consisted of three individuals whom it designated in advance. Until 2019, a team's score was the sum of the ranks of its three team members, with the lowest cumulative rank winning. It was entirely possible, even commonplace at some institutions, for the eventual results to show that the "wrong" team was picked—i.e. that some students not on the official team outscored an official team member. For example, in 2010, MIT had two of the top five scorers in the competition and seven of the top 24, while Caltech had just one student in the top five and only four in the top 24; yet Caltech took first place among teams while MIT took second. In 2019 the rules of the competition changed, with a school's team consisting of its top three scorers, and team ranks determined by comparing the sums of the scores of the team members.

=== Awards ===
The top five teams win $25,000, $20,000, $15,000, $10,000, and $5,000, in that order, with team members receiving $1,000, $800, $600, $400, and $200, respectively.

The top five individual scorers are named Putnam Fellows and awarded $2,500. The school with the first-place team receives an award of $25,000. Each first-place team member, as well as the winner of the Elizabeth Lowell Putnam Prize, receives $1,000. Sixth through 15th place individuals receive $1,000 and the next ten receive $250. The names of the top 100 students are published in the American Mathematical Monthly, and competition results are published in early April of the year following the competition.

Many Putnam Fellows have gone on to become distinguished researchers in mathematics and other fields, including three Fields Medalists—John Milnor (also an Abel Prize laureate), David Mumford, and Daniel Quillen—and two Nobel laureates in physics—Richard Feynman and Kenneth Wilson.

== Winners ==
=== Top-scoring teams ===
Year	First	Second	Third	Fourth	Fifth
1938	Toronto	UC Berkeley	Columbia		
1939	Brooklyn College	MIT	Mississippi Woman's		
1940	Toronto	Yale	Columbia		
1941	Brooklyn College	UPenn	MIT		
1942	Toronto	Yale	MIT	City College of NY	
1946	Toronto	MIT	Brooklyn College	Carnegie Tech	
1947	Harvard	Yale	Columbia	UPenn	
1948	Brooklyn College	Toronto	Harvard	City College of NY **and** McGill	
1949	Harvard	Toronto	Carnegie Tech	City College of NY	
1950	Caltech	Harvard	NYU	Toronto	
1951	Cornell	Harvard	Cooper Union	City College of NY	
1952	Queen's	Brooklyn Polytech	Harvard	MIT	
1953	Harvard	City College of NY	Cornell	UC Berkeley	
1954	Cornell	Harvard	MIT	Toronto	
1955	Harvard	Toronto	Yale	Kenyon	
1956	Harvard	Columbia	Queen's	MIT	
1957	Harvard	Columbia	Cornell	Caltech	
1958 (Spring)	Brooklyn Polytech	Harvard	Toronto	Manitoba	
1958 (Fall)	Harvard	Toronto	Caltech	Cornell	
1959	Brooklyn Polytech	Caltech	Toronto	Harvard	Case Tech
1960	UC Berkeley	Harvard	MIT	Michigan State	Cornell
1961	Michigan State	MIT	Caltech	Harvard	Dartmouth
1962	Caltech	Dartmouth	Harvard	Queen's	UCLA
1963	Michigan State	Brooklyn College	UPenn	Caltech	MIT
1964	Caltech	MIT	Harvard	Case Tech	UC Berkeley
1965	Harvard	MIT	Toronto	Princeton	Caltech
1966	Harvard	MIT	Chicago	Michigan	Princeton
1967	Michigan State	Caltech	Harvard	MIT	Michigan
1968	MIT	Waterloo	UCLA	Michigan State	Kansas
1969	MIT	Rice	Chicago	Harvard	Yale
1970	Chicago	MIT	Toronto	Illinois Tech	Caltech
1971	Caltech	Chicago	Harvard	UC Davis	MIT
1972	Caltech	Oberlin	Harvard	Swarthmore	MIT
1973	Caltech	British Columbia	Chicago	Harvard	Princeton
1974	Waterloo	Chicago	Caltech	MIT	British Columbia
1975	Caltech	Chicago	MIT	Princeton	Harvard
1976	Caltech	Washington U in StL	Princeton	Case Western Reserve **and** MIT	
1977	Washington U in StL	UC Davis	Caltech	Princeton	MIT
1978	Case Western Reserve	Washington U in StL	Waterloo	Harvard	Caltech
1979	MIT	Caltech	Princeton	Stanford	Waterloo
1980	Washington U in StL	Harvard	Maryland	Chicago	UC Berkeley
1981	Washington U in StL	Princeton	Harvard	Stanford	Maryland
1982	Harvard	Waterloo	Caltech	Yale	Princeton
1983	Caltech	Washington U in StL	Waterloo	Princeton	Chicago
1984	UC Davis **and** Washington U in StL		Harvard	Princeton	Yale
1985	Harvard	Princeton	UC Berkeley	Rice	Waterloo
1986	Harvard	Washington U in StL	UC Berkeley	Yale	MIT
1987	Harvard	Princeton	Carnegie Mellon	UC Berkeley	MIT
1988	Harvard	Princeton	Rice	Waterloo	Caltech
1989	Harvard	Princeton	Waterloo	Yale	Rice
1990	Harvard	Duke	Waterloo	Yale	Washington U in StL
1991	Harvard	Waterloo	Harvey Mudd	Stanford	Yale
1992	Harvard	Toronto	Waterloo	Princeton	Cornell
1993	Duke	Harvard	Miami University	MIT	Michigan
1994	Harvard	Cornell	MIT	Princeton	Waterloo
1995	Harvard	Cornell	MIT	Toronto	Princeton
1996	Duke	Princeton	Harvard	Washington U in StL	Caltech
1997	Harvard	Duke	Princeton	MIT	Washington U in StL
1998	Harvard	MIT	Princeton	Caltech	Waterloo
1999	Waterloo	Harvard	Duke	Michigan	Chicago
2000	Duke	MIT	Harvard	Caltech	Toronto
2001	Harvard	MIT	Duke	UC Berkeley	Stanford
2002	Harvard	Princeton	Duke	UC Berkeley	Stanford
2003	MIT	Harvard	Duke	Caltech	Harvey Mudd
2004	MIT	Princeton	Duke	Waterloo	Caltech
2005	Harvard	Princeton	Duke	MIT	Waterloo
2006	Princeton	Harvard	MIT	Toronto	Chicago
2007	Harvard	Princeton	MIT	Stanford	Duke
2008	Harvard	Princeton	MIT	Stanford	Caltech
2009	MIT	Harvard	Caltech	Stanford	Princeton
2010	Caltech	MIT	Harvard	UC Berkeley	Waterloo
2011	Harvard	Carnegie Mellon	Caltech	Stanford	MIT
2012	Harvard	MIT	UCLA	Stony Brook	Carnegie Mellon
2013	MIT	Carnegie Mellon	Stanford	Harvard	Caltech
2014	MIT	Harvard	RPI	Waterloo	Carnegie Mellon
2015	MIT	Carnegie Mellon	Princeton	Stanford	Harvard
2016	Carnegie Mellon	Princeton	Harvard	MIT	Stanford
2017	MIT	Harvard	Princeton	Toronto	UCLA
2018	Harvard	MIT	UCLA	Columbia	Stanford
2019	MIT	Harvard	Stanford	UCLA	Waterloo
2021	MIT	Princeton	Harvard	Stanford	UCLA
2022	MIT	Harvard	Stanford	Maryland	Yale
2023	MIT	Harvard	Duke	Stanford	Toronto
2024	MIT	Harvard	Stanford	Carnegie Mellon	UC Santa Barbara
2025	MIT	Chicago	Harvard	Stanford	Caltech

=== Teams ranked by historical performance ===
Below is a table of teams by the number of appearances in the top five and number of titles.

The following table lists Teams finishing in Top Five (as of 2025 competition):

Top Five	Team(s)
70	Harvard
55	MIT
34	Caltech
33	Princeton
20	Toronto, Waterloo
19	Stanford
12	Yale, Duke, Chicago
11	Washington University in St. Louis
10	UC Berkeley, Cornell, Carnegie Mellon (including former Carnegie Tech)
7	UCLA
6	Columbia
5	Brooklyn College, City College of New York, Michigan State
4	Case Western Reserve (including former Case Tech), Michigan, Rice
3	Brooklyn Polytech, UC Davis, Queen's, Penn, Maryland
2	British Columbia, Dartmouth, Harvey Mudd
1	UC Santa Barbara, Cooper Union, Illinois Tech, Kansas, Kenyon, Manitoba, McGill, Miami University, RPI; NYU, Oberlin, Stony Brook, Swarthmore, William Carey (under former name of Mississippi Woman's)

For a recent analysis, the following table lists teams that finished in the top five since 2000 (as of 2025 competition):

Top Five	Team(s)
24	Harvard, MIT
16	Stanford
11	Princeton
9	Caltech
8	Duke
7	Carnegie Mellon
5	UCLA, Waterloo
4	Toronto
3	UC Berkeley
2	Chicago
1	UC Santa Barbara, Harvey Mudd, Stony Brook, Yale, RPI, Columbia, Maryland

The following table lists Teams with First place finishes (as of 2025 competition):

First Place	Team(s)
30	Harvard
16	MIT
10	Caltech
4	Toronto, Washington University in St. Louis
3	Brooklyn College, Duke, Michigan State
2	Brooklyn Polytech, Cornell, Waterloo
1	UC Berkeley, UC Davis, Carnegie Mellon, Case Western Reserve, Chicago, Princeton, Queen's

=== Putnam Fellows ===
Since the first competition, the top five (or six, in case of a tie) scorers in the competition have been named Putnam Fellows. Within the top five, Putnam Fellows are not ranked. Students are not allowed to participate in the Putnam Competition more than four times. For example, if a high school senior chooses to officially participate, he/she effectively chooses to forfeit one of his/her years of eligibility in college (see Gabriel Carroll). This makes it even more of a remarkable feat to become a Putnam Fellow four times. In the history of the Competition, only nine students have been Putnam Fellows four times, with twenty-four others winning the award three times. The following table lists these students:

Name	School	Years			
Don Coppersmith	MIT	1968	1969	1970	1971
Arthur Rubin	Purdue, Caltech	1970	1971	1972	1973
Bjorn M. Poonen	Harvard	1985	1986	1987	1988
Ravi D. Vakil	Toronto	1988	1989	1990	1991
Gabriel D. Carroll	UC Berkeley, Harvard	2000	2001	2002	2003
Reid W. Barton	MIT	2001	2002	2003	2004
Daniel Kane	MIT	2003	2004	2005	2006
Brian R. Lawrence	Caltech	2007	2008	2010	2011
Luke Robitaille	MIT	2022	2023	2024	2025
Edward L. Kaplan	Carnegie Tech	1939	1940	1941	
Andrew M. Gleason	Yale	1940	1941	1942	
Donald J. Newman	City College of NY	1948	1949	1950	
James B. Herreshoff IV	UC Berkeley	1951	1952	1953	
Samuel Jacob Klein	City College of NY	1953	1959	1960	
Randall L. Dougherty	UC Berkeley	1978	1979	1980	
Eric D. Carlson	Michigan State	1980	1982	1983	
David W. Ash	Waterloo	1981	1982	1983	
Noam D. Elkies	Columbia	1982	1983	1984	
David J. Grabiner	Princeton	1986	1987	1988	
David J. Moews	Harvard	1986	1987	1988	
J. P. Grossman	Toronto	1993	1994	1995	
Kiran S. Kedlaya	Harvard	1993	1994	1995	
Lenhard L. Ng	Harvard	1993	1994	1995	
Ciprian Manolescu	Harvard	1997	1998	2000	
Aaron C. Pixton	Princeton	2004	2005	2007	
Yufei Zhao	MIT	2006	2008	2009	
Arnav Tripathy	Harvard	2007	2008	2009	
Seok Hyeong Lee	Stanford	2008	2010	2011	
Evan M. O'Dorney	UC Berkeley, Harvard	2011	2012	2013	
Zipei Nie	MIT	2012	2013	2014	
David H. Yang	MIT	2013	2014	2015	
Yunkun Zhou	MIT	2015	2016	2017	
Shengtong Zhang	MIT	2018	2019	2021	
Daniel Zhu	MIT	2019	2021	2022	
Papon Lapate	MIT	2022	2023	2024	
Brian Liu	MIT	2022	2023	2024	

The following table lists all Putnam fellows from 1938 to present, with the years they placed in the top five. Ioana Dumitriu was the first woman to become a Putnam Fellow, in 1996.

Name (School)	Year (s)
George W. Mackey (Rice)	1938
Irving Kaplansky (Toronto)	1938
Michael J. Norris (College of St. Thomas)	1938
Robert W. Gibson (Fort Hays Kansas State)	1938
Bernard Sherman (Brooklyn College)	1938, 1939
Abraham Hillman (Brooklyn College)	1939
Richard P. Feynman (MIT)	1939
William Nierenberg (City College of NY)	1939
Edward L. Kaplan (Carnegie Tech)	1939, 1940, 1941
John Cotton Maynard (Toronto)	1940
Robert Maughan Snow (George Washington)	1940
W. J. R. Crosby (Toronto)	1940
Andrew M. Gleason (Yale)	1940, 1941, 1942
Paul C. Rosenbloom (UPenn)	1941
Richard F. Arens (UCLA)	1941
Samuel I. Askovitz (UPenn)	1941
Harold Victor Lyons (Toronto)	1942
Harvey Cohn (City College of NY)	1942
Melvin A. Preston (Toronto)	1942
Warren S. Loud (MIT)	1942
Donald A. Fraser (Toronto)	1946
Eugenio Calabi (MIT)	1946
Felix Browder (MIT)	1946
J. Arthur Greenwood (Harvard)	1946
Maxwell A. Rosenlicht (Columbia)	1946, 1947
Clarence Wilson Hewlett, Jr. (Harvard)	1947
William Turanski (UPenn)	1947
Eoin L. Whitney (Alberta)	1947, 1948
W. Forrest Stinespring (Harvard)	1947, 1949
George F. D. Duff (Toronto)	1948
Harry Gonshor (McGill)	1948
Leonard Geller (Brooklyn College)	1948
Robert L. Mills (Columbia)	1948
Donald J. Newman (City College of NY)	1948, 1949, 1950
Ariel Zemach (Harvard)	1949
David L. Yarmush (Harvard)	1949
John W. Milnor (Princeton)	1949, 1950
John P. Mayberry (Toronto)	1950
Richard J. Semple (Toronto)	1950
Z. Alexander Melzak (British Columbia)	1950
Arthur P. Dempster (Toronto)	1951
Harold Widom (City College of NY)	1951
Herbert C. Kranzer (NYU)	1951
Peter John Redmond (Cooper Union)	1951
James B. Herreshoff IV (UC Berkeley)	1951, 1952, 1953
Eugene R. Rodemich (Washington U in StL)	1952
Gerhard Rayna (Harvard)	1952
Richard G. Swan (Princeton)	1952
Walter Lewis Baily, Jr. (MIT)	1952
Marshall L. Freimer (Harvard)	1953
Norman Bauman (Harvard)	1953
Tai Tsun Wu (Minnesota)	1953
Samuel Jacob Klein (City College of NY)	1953, 1959, 1960
Benjamin Muckenhoupt (Harvard)	1954
James Daniel Bjorken (MIT)	1954
Leonard Evens (Cornell)	1954
William P. Hanf (UC Berkeley)	1954
Kenneth G. Wilson (Harvard)	1954, 1956
Howard C. Rumsey, Jr. (Caltech)	1955
Jack Towber (Brooklyn College)	1955
David B. Mumford (Harvard)	1955, 1956
Trevor Barker (Kenyon)	1955, 1956
Everett C. Dade (Harvard)	1955, 1957
Richard Michael Friedberg (Harvard)	1956
David M. Bloom (Columbia)	1956, 1957
J. Ian Richards (Minnesota)	1957
Richard T. Bumby (MIT)	1957
Rohit J. Parikh (Harvard)	1957
David R. Brillinger (Toronto)	Spring 1958
Donald J. C. Bures (Queen's)	Spring 1958
Lawrence A. Shepp (Brooklyn Polytech)	Spring 1958
Richard M. Dudley (Harvard)	Spring 1958
Joseph Lipman (Toronto)	Spring 1958, Fall 1958
Alan Gaisford Waterman (San Diego State)	Fall 1958
John Rex Forrester Hewett (Toronto)	Fall 1958
Robert C. Hartshorne (Harvard)	Fall 1958
Alfred W. Hales (Caltech)	Fall 1958, 1959
Daniel G. Quillen (Harvard)	1959
Donald Passman (Brooklyn Polytech)	1959
Donald S. Gorman (Harvard)	1959
Martin Isaacs (Brooklyn Polytech)	1959
Stephen L. Adler (Harvard)	1959
Stephen Lichtenbaum (Harvard)	1959
Jon H. Folkman (UC Berkeley)	1960
Louis Jaeckel (UCLA)	1960
Melvin Hochster (Harvard)	1960
William R. Emerson (Caltech)	1960
Barry Wolk (Manitoba)	1961
Elwyn R. Berlekamp (MIT)	1961
Edward Anton Bender (Caltech)	1961, 1962
John Hathaway Lindsey (Caltech)	1961, 1962
William C. Waterhouse (Harvard)	1961, 1962
John William Wood (Harvard)	1962
Robert S. Strichartz (Dartmouth)	1962
Joel H. Spencer (MIT)	1963
Lawrence A. Zalcman (Dartmouth)	1963
Lawrence J. Corwin (Harvard)	1963
Robert E. Greene (Michigan State)	1963
Stephen E. Crick, Jr. (Michigan State)	1963
Barry B. MacKichan (Harvard)	1964
Fred William Roush (UNC Chapel Hill)	1964
Roger E. Howe (Harvard)	1964
Rufus (Robert) Bowen (UC Berkeley)	1964, 1965
Vern Sheridan Poythress (Caltech)	1964
Andreas R. Blass (Detroit)	1965
Barry Simon (Harvard)	1965
Daniel Fendel (Harvard)	1965
Lon M. Rosen (Toronto)	1965
Marshall W. Buck (Harvard)	1966
Robert E. Maas (Santa Clara)	1966
Robert S. Winternitz (MIT)	1966
Theodore C. Chang (MIT)	1966
Richard C. Schroeppel (MIT)	1966, 1967
David R. Haynor (Harvard)	1967
Dennis A. Hejhal (Chicago)	1967
Don B. Zagier (MIT)	1967
Peter L. Montgomery (UC Berkeley)	1967
Dean G. Huffman (Yale)	1968
Gerald S. Gras (MIT)	1968
Neal Koblitz (Harvard)	1968
Gerald A. Edgar (UC Santa Barbara)	1968, 1969
Don Coppersmith (MIT)	1968, 1969, 1970, 1971
Alan R. Beale (Rice)	1969
Steven K. Winkler (MIT)	1969, 1970
Robert A. Oliver (Chicago)	1969, 1970
Jeffrey Lagarias (MIT)	1970
Jockum Aniansson (Yale)	1970
Arthur Rubin (Purdue, Caltech)	1970, 1971, 1972, 1973
Dale Peterson (Yale)	1971
David Shucker (Swarthmore)	1971
Robert Israel (Chicago)	1971
Michael Yoder (Caltech)	1971, 1972
Arthur Rothstein (Reed)	1972
David Vogan (Chicago)	1972
Dean Hickerson (UC Davis)	1972
Ira Gessel (Harvard)	1972
Angelos J. Tsirimokos (Princeton)	1973
Matthew L. Ginsberg (Wesleyan)	1973
Peter G. De Buda (Toronto)	1973
David J. Anick (MIT)	1973, 1975
Grant M. Roberts (Waterloo)	1974
James B. Saxe (Union)	1974
Karl C. Rubin (Princeton)	1974
Philip N. Strenski (Armstrong State)	1974
Thomas G. Goodwillie (Harvard)	1974, 1975
Ernest S. Davis (MIT)	1975
Franklin T. Adams (Chicago)	1975
Christopher L. Henley (Caltech)	1975, 1976
David J. Wright (Cornell)	1976
Nathaniel S. Kuhn (Harvard)	1976
Paul M. Herdig (Case Western Reserve)	1976
Philip I. Harrington (Washington U in StL)	1976
Steven T. Tschantz (UC Berkeley)	1976, 1978
Adam L. Stephanides (Chicago)	1977, 1981
Michael Roberts (MIT)	1977
Paul A. Vojta (Minnesota)	1977
Stephen W. Modzelewski (Harvard)	1977
Russell D. Lyons (Case Western Reserve)	1977, 1978
Mark R. Kleiman (Princeton)	1978
Peter W. Shor (Caltech)	1978
Randall L. Dougherty (UC Berkeley)	1978, 1979, 1980
Charles H. Walter (Princeton)	1979
Mark G. Pleszkoch (Virginia)	1979
Miller Puckette (MIT)	1979
Richard Mifflin (Rice)	1979
Daniel J. Goldstein (Chicago)	1980
Laurence E. Penn (Harvard)	1980
Michael Raship (Harvard)	1980
Eric D. Carlson (Michigan State)	1980, 1982, 1983
Robin Pemantle (UC Berkeley)	1981
Scott R. Fluhrer (Case Western Reserve)	1981
David W. Ash (Waterloo)	1981, 1982, 1983
Michael J. Larsen (Harvard)	1981, 1983
Brian R. Hunt (Maryland)	1982
Edward A. Shpiz (Washington U in StL)	1982
Noam D. Elkies (Columbia)	1982, 1983, 1984
Gregg N. Patruno (Princeton)	1983
Benji N. Fisher (Harvard)	1984
Daniel W. Johnson (Rose-Hulman Tech)	1984
Richard A. Stong (Washington U in StL)	1984
Michael Reid (Harvard)	1984, 1987
Everett W. Howe (Caltech)	1985
Keith A. Ramsay (Chicago)	1985
Martin V. Hildebrand (Williams)	1985
Douglas S. Jungreis (Harvard)	1985, 1986
Bjorn M. Poonen (Harvard)	1985, 1986, 1987, 1988
David I. Zuckerman (Harvard)	1986
Waldemar P. Horwat (MIT)	1986
David J. Grabiner (Princeton)	1986, 1987, 1988
David J. Moews (Harvard)	1986, 1987, 1988
Constantin S. Teleman (Harvard)	1987
John S. Tillinghast (UC Davis)	1987
Jeremy A. Kahn (Harvard)	1988
Ravi D. Vakil (Toronto)	1988, 1989, 1990, 1991
Andrew H. Kresch (Yale)	1989
Christos A. Athanasiadis (MIT)	1989
Colin M. Springer (Waterloo)	1989
Sihao Wu (Yale)	1989
William P. Cross (Caltech)	1989
Jordan Lampe (UC Berkeley)	1990
Raymond M. Sidney (Harvard)	1990
Eric K. Wepsic (Harvard)	1990, 1991
Jordan S. Ellenberg (Harvard)	1990, 1992
Joshua B. Fischman (Princeton)	1991
Xi Chen (Missouri–Rolla)	1991
Samuel A. Kutin (Harvard)	1991, 1992
Jeffrey M. Vanderkam (Duke)	1992
Serban M. Nacu (Harvard)	1992
Adam M. Logan (Princeton)	1992, 1993
Craig B. Gentry (Duke)	1993
Wei-Hwa Huang (Caltech)	1993
J. P. Grossman (Toronto)	1993, 1994, 1995
Kiran S. Kedlaya (Harvard)	1993, 1994, 1995
Lenhard L. Ng (Harvard)	1993, 1994, 1995
William R. Mann (Princeton)	1994
Jeremy L. Bem (Cornell)	1994, 1996
Sergey V. Levin (Harvard)	1995
Yevgeniy Dodis (NYU)	1995
Dragos N. Oprea (Harvard)	1996
Ioana Dumitriu (NYU)	1996
Robert D. Kleinberg (Cornell)	1996
Stephen S. Wang (Harvard)	1996
Daniel K. Schepler (Washington U in StL)	1996, 1997
Ovidiu Savin (Pittsburgh)	1997
Patrick K. Corn (Harvard)	1997
Samuel Grushevsky (Harvard)	1997
Mike L. Develin (Harvard)	1997, 1998
Ciprian Manolescu (Harvard)	1997, 1998, 2000
Ari M. Turner (Princeton)	1998
Nathan G. Curtis (Duke)	1998
Kevin D. Lacker (Duke)	1998, 2001
Christopher C. Mihelich (Harvard)	1999
Colin A. Percival (Simon Fraser)	1999
Davesh Maulik (Harvard)	1999
Derek I.E. Kisman (Waterloo)	1999
Sabin Cautis (Waterloo)	1999
Abhinav Kumar (MIT)	1999, 2000
Pavlo Pylyavskyy (MIT)	2000
Alexander B. Schwartz (Harvard)	2000, 2002
Gabriel D. Carroll (UC Berkeley, Harvard)	2000, 2001, 2002, 2003
George Lee, Jr. (Harvard)	2001
Jan K. Siwanowicz (City College of NY)	2001
Reid W. Barton (MIT)	2001, 2002, 2003, 2004
Deniss Cebikins (MIT)	2002
Melanie E. Wood (Duke)	2002
Ralph C. Furmaniak (Waterloo)	2003
Ana Caraiani (Princeton)	2003, 2004
Daniel M. Kane (MIT)	2003, 2004, 2005, 2006
Vladimir V. Barzov (MIT)	2004
Aaron Pixton (Princeton)	2004, 2005, 2007
Oleg I. Golberg (MIT)	2005
Matthew M. Ince (MIT)	2005
Ricky I. Liu (Harvard)	2005
Tiankai Liu (Harvard)	2005, 2006
Hansheng Diao (MIT)	2006
Po-Ru Loh (Caltech)	2006
Yufei Zhao (MIT)	2006, 2008, 2009
Jason C. Bland (Caltech)	2007
Brian R. Lawrence (Caltech)	2007, 2008, 2010, 2011
Qingchun Ren (MIT)	2007, 2009
Xuancheng Shao (MIT)	2007
Arnav Tripathy (Harvard)	2007, 2008, 2009
Seok Hyeong Lee (Stanford)	2008, 2010, 2011
Bohua Zhan (MIT)	2008
William A. Johnson (U of Washington)	2009
Xiaosheng Mu (Yale)	2009, 2011
Yu Deng (MIT)	2010
Colin P. Sandon (MIT)	2010
Alex (Lin) Zhai (Harvard)	2010
Samuel S. Elder (Caltech)	2011
Evan M. O'Dorney (Harvard)	2011, 2012, 2013
Benjamin P. Gunby (MIT)	2012
Eric K. Larson (Harvard)	2012
Mitchell M. Lee (MIT)	2012, 2013
Zipei Nie (MIT)	2012, 2013, 2014
Bobby C. Shen (MIT)	2013, 2014
David H. Yang (MIT)	2013, 2014, 2015
Ravi Jagadeesan (Harvard)	2014
Mark A. Sellke (MIT)	2014
Lingfu Zhang (MIT)	2014
Pakawut Jiradilok (Harvard)	2015
Bumsoo Kim (Princeton)	2015
Gyujin Oh (Stanford)	2015
Daniel Spivak (Waterloo)	2015
Yunkun Zhou (MIT)	2015, 2016, 2017
Joshua D. Brakensiek (Carnegie Mellon)	2016
Dong Ryul Kim (Harvard)	2016, 2018
Thomas E. Swayze (Carnegie Mellon)	2016
Samuel Zbarsky (Carnegie Mellon)	2016
David Stoner (Harvard)	2017, 2018
Ömer Cerrahoğlu (MIT)	2017
Jiyang Gao (MIT)	2017
Junyao Peng (MIT)	2017
Ashwin Sah (MIT)	2017, 2019
Yuan Yao (MIT)	2018, 2019
Shengtong Zhang (MIT)	2018, 2019, 2021
Shyam Narayanan (Harvard)	2018
Kevin Sun (MIT)	2019
Daniel Zhu (MIT)	2019, 2021, 2022
Andrew Gu (MIT)	2021
Michael Ren (MIT)	2021
Edward Wan (MIT)	2021
Mingyang Deng (MIT)	2022
Papon Lapate (MIT)	2022, 2023, 2024
Brian Liu (MIT)	2022, 2023, 2024
Luke Robitaille (MIT)	2022, 2023, 2024, 2025
Ankit Bisain (MIT)	2023
Jiangqi Dai (MIT)	2023, 2024
Qiao Sun (MIT)	2024
Jack Hu (Chicago)	2025
Cheng Jiang (MIT)	2025
Chunji Wang (MIT)	2025
Zixiang Zhou (MIT)	2025

=== Elizabeth Lowell Putnam Award winners ===
Since 1992, the Elizabeth Lowell Putnam Award has been available to be awarded to a female participant with a high score, with three awards being made for the first time in 2019. The year(s) in which they were Fellows are in bold. Ioana Dumitriu was the first woman to become a Putnam Fellow, in 1996.

Name	School	Year (s)
Dana Pascovici	Dartmouth	1992
Ruth A. Britto-Pacumio	MIT	1994
Ioana Dumitriu	NYU	1995, **1996**, 1997
Wai Ling Yee	Waterloo	1999
Melanie E. Wood	Duke	2001, **2002**
Ana Caraiani	Princeton	**2003, 2004**
Alison B. Miller	Harvard	2005, 2006, 2007
Viktoriya Krakovna	Toronto	2008
Yinghui Wang	MIT	2011
Fei Song	Virginia	2011
Xiao Wu	Yale	2013
Simona Diaconu	Princeton	2016
Ni Yan	UCLA	2017
Danielle Wang	MIT	2015, 2018
Laura Pierson	Harvard	2019
Qi Qi	MIT	2019
Hanzhi Zheng	Stanford	2019
Dain Kim	MIT	2021
Binwei Yan	MIT	2022
Isabella Zhu	MIT	2023
Jessica Wan	MIT	2024, 2025

== See also ==
- List of mathematics awards
