= Reid W. Barton =

American mathematician

Reid William Barton
- Born: May 6, 1983 (age 43); Arlington, Massachusetts
- Education: MIT; Harvard University
- Awards: Morgan Prize (2004); 4× IMO Gold Medalist; 2× IOI Gold Medalist; 4× Putnam Fellow
- Scientific career
- Fields: Mathematics
- Academic advisors: Charles E. Leiserson, Michael J. Hopkins

Reid William Barton (born May 6, 1983) is a mathematician and also one of the most successful performers in the International Science Olympiads.

== Biography ==
Barton is the son of two environmental engineers. Barton took part-time classes at Tufts University in chemistry (5th grade), physics (6th grade), and subsequently Swedish, Finnish, French, and Chinese. Since eighth grade he worked part-time with MIT computer scientist Charles E. Leiserson on CilkChess, a computer chess program. Subsequently, he worked at Akamai Technologies with computer scientist Ramesh Sitaraman to build one of the earliest video performance measurement systems that have since become a standard in industry. After Akamai, Barton went to grad school at Harvard to pursue a Ph.D. in mathematics, which he completed in 2019 under the supervision of Michael J. Hopkins. Afterwards, he did research as a post-doctoral fellow at Pittsburgh and Carnegie Mellon University and works on formalizing mathematics with Lean. As of November 2021 he sits on the committee for the International Mathematical Olympiad Grand Challenge (which asks to develop an AI model capable of winning a gold medal from IMO).

== Mathematical and programming competitions ==
Barton was the first student to win four gold medals at the International Mathematical Olympiad, culminating in full marks at the 2001 Olympiad held in Washington, D.C., shared with Gabriel Carroll, Xiao Liang and Zhang Zhiqiang.

Barton is one of seven people to have placed among the five top ranked competitors (who are themselves not ranked against each other) in the William Lowell Putnam Competition four times (2001–2004). Barton was a member of the MIT team which finished second in 2001 and first in 2003 and 2004.

Barton has won two gold medals at the International Olympiad in Informatics. In 2001 he finished first with 580 points out of 600, 55 ahead of his nearest competitor, the largest margin in IOI history at the time. Barton was a member of the 2nd and 5th place MIT team at the ACM International Collegiate Programming Contest, and reached the finals in the Topcoder Open (2004), semi-finals (2003, 2006), the TopCoder Collegiate Challenge (2004), semi-finals (2006), TCCC Regional finals (2002), and TopCoder Invitational semi-finalist (2002). He teamed with Tomek Czajka and John Dethridge to win the internet problem solving contest in 2015.

== Other accomplishments ==
Barton has won the Morgan Prize awarded jointly by the American Mathematical Society and the Mathematical Association of America for his work on packing densities.

Barton has taught at various academic Olympiad training programs for high school students, such as the Mathematical Olympiad Summer Program.

== Selected publications ==
- ——— (2004-11-12). "Packing densities of patterns" (PDF). Electronic Journal of Combinatorics. 11 (1): R80. doi:10.37236/1833.
- ———; Burns, Keith (2000). "A simple special case of Sharkovskii's theorem". American Mathematical Monthly. 107 (10): 932–933. doi:10.2307/2695586. JSTOR 2695586.
