= International Mathematical Olympiad =

Annual high school maths competition

Logo of the International Mathematical Olympiad

The International Mathematical Olympiad (IMO) is an annual mathematical competition for pre-university students, and is the oldest of the International Science Olympiads. It is widely regarded as the most prestigious mathematical competition in the world. The first IMO was held in Romania in 1959. It has since been held annually, except in 1980. More than 100 countries participate. Each country sends a team of up to six students, plus one team leader, one deputy leader, and observers.

The contest takes place over two days, and consists of six problems (three given on each day). The problems are extremely difficult, and may include topics not conventionally covered in school, but they avoid the use of calculus. Awards are given to approximately the top-scoring 50% of the individual contestants. Teams are not officially recognized—all scores are given only to individual contestants, but team scoring is unofficially compared more than individual scores.

== Scoring and format ==
The competition consists of six problems. The competition is held over two consecutive days with three problems each; each day, the contestants have 4.5 hours to solve three problems. Each problem is worth 7 points for a maximum total score of 42 points. Calculators are banned. Protractors were banned recently.

Each country's marks are agreed between that country's leader and deputy leader, and coordinators provided by the host country (the leader of the team whose country submitted the problem in the case of the marks of the host country), subject to the decisions of the chief coordinator and, ultimately, a jury if any disputes cannot be resolved.

=== Question type ===
Unlike other science olympiads, the IMO has no official syllabus and does not cover any university-level topics. The problems chosen are from various areas of secondary school mathematics, broadly classifiable as geometry, number theory, algebra, and combinatorics. They require no knowledge of higher mathematics such as calculus and analysis, and solutions are often elementary. However, they are usually disguised so as to make the solutions difficult. The problems given in the IMO are largely designed to require creativity and the ability to solve problems quickly. Thus, the prominently featured problems are algebraic inequalities, complex numbers, and construction-oriented geometrical problems, though in recent years, the latter has not been as popular as before because of the algorithmic use of theorems like Muirhead's inequality, and complex/analytic bashing to solve problems.

The content ranges from extremely difficult algebra and pre-calculus problems to problems in branches of mathematics not conventionally covered in secondary or high school and often not at university level either, such as projective and complex geometry, functional equations, combinatorics, and well-grounded number theory, of which extensive knowledge of theorems is required. Calculus, though allowed in solutions, is never required, as there is a principle that anyone with a basic understanding of mathematics should understand the problems, even if the solutions require a great deal more knowledge. Supporters of this principle claim that it allows more universality and creates an incentive to find elegant, deceptively simple-looking problems that nevertheless require a certain level of ingenuity, oftentimes a great deal of ingenuity, to net all points for a given IMO problem.

=== Problem selection ===
Each participating country, other than the host country, may submit suggested problems to a problem selection committee provided by the host country, which reduces the submitted problems to a shortlist. The team leaders arrive at the IMO a few days in advance of the contestants and form the IMO jury, which is responsible for all the formal decisions relating to the contest, starting with selecting the six problems from the shortlist. The jury aims to order the problems so that the order in increasing difficulty is Q1, Q4, Q2, Q5, Q3, and Q6, where the first day problems Q1, Q2, and Q3 are in increasing difficulty, and the second day problems Q4, Q5, and Q6 are in increasing difficulty. The team leaders of all countries are given the problems in advance of the contestants, and thus, are kept strictly separated and observed.

== Team selection ==
The selection process differs by country, but it often consists of a series of tests that admit fewer students at each test. Contestants must be under the age of 20 and must not be registered at any tertiary institution. Subject to these conditions, an individual may participate any number of times in the IMO.

A stage in the process of solving a problem from the AIME, part of the United States' selection process

In some countries, especially those in East Asia, the selection process involves several tests of a difficulty comparable to the IMO itself. The Chinese contestants go through a camp. In others, such as the United States, possible participants go through a series of easier standalone competitions that gradually increase in difficulty. In the United States, the tests include the American Mathematics Competitions, the American Invitational Mathematics Examination, and the United States of America Junior Mathematical Olympiad/United States of America Mathematical Olympiad, each of which is a competition in its own right. For high scorers in the final competition for the team selection, there also is a summer camp, like that of China.

In countries of the former Soviet Union and other eastern European countries, a team has in the past been chosen several years beforehand, and they are given special training specifically for the event. However, such methods have been discontinued in some countries.

India selects its team for the IMO through a multi-stage selection process organized by the Homi Bhabha Centre for Science Education (HBCSE), a centre of the Tata Institute of Fundamental Research (TIFR). The selection process begins with the Indian Olympiad Qualifier in Mathematics (IOQM). Successful candidates qualify for the Regional Mathematical Olympiad (RMO). Top performers from the RMO are then selected for the Indian National Mathematical Olympiad (INMO), a national-level examination consisting of proof-oriented problems. Students who perform well in the INMO are invited to the International Mathematical Olympiad Training Camp (IMOTC), held annually at HBCSE or Chennai Mathematical Institute. During the camp, participants receive training in advanced mathematics and take a series of selection tests. Based on their overall performance throughout the camp, six students are selected to represent India at the International Mathematical Olympiad. The team is accompanied by a leader and a deputy leader appointed by HBCSE.

== Awards ==
The participants are ranked based on their individual scores. Medals are awarded to the highest ranked participants; slightly fewer than half of them receive a medal. The cutoffs (minimum scores required to receive a gold, silver, or bronze medal respectively) are then chosen so that the numbers of gold, silver and bronze medals awarded are approximately in the ratios 1:2:3. Participants who do not win a medal but who score 7 points on at least one problem receive an honorable mention.

Special prizes may be awarded for solutions of outstanding elegance or involving good generalisations of a problem. This last happened in 1995 (Nikolay Nikolov, Bulgaria) and 2005 (Iurie Boreico), but was more frequent up to the early 1980s. The special prize in 2005 was awarded to Iurie Boreico, a student from Moldova, for his solution to Problem 3, a three-variable inequality.

The rule that at most half the contestants win a medal is sometimes broken if it would cause the total number of medals to deviate too much from half the number of contestants. This last happened in 2010 (when the choice was to give either 226 (43.71%) or 266 (51.45%) of the 517 contestants (excluding the 6 from North Korea — see below) a medal), 2012 (when the choice was to give either 226 (41.24%) or 277 (50.55%) of the 548 contestants a medal), and 2013, when the choice was to give either 249 (47.16%) or 278 (52.65%) of the 528 contestants a medal. In these cases, slightly more than half the contestants were awarded a medal.

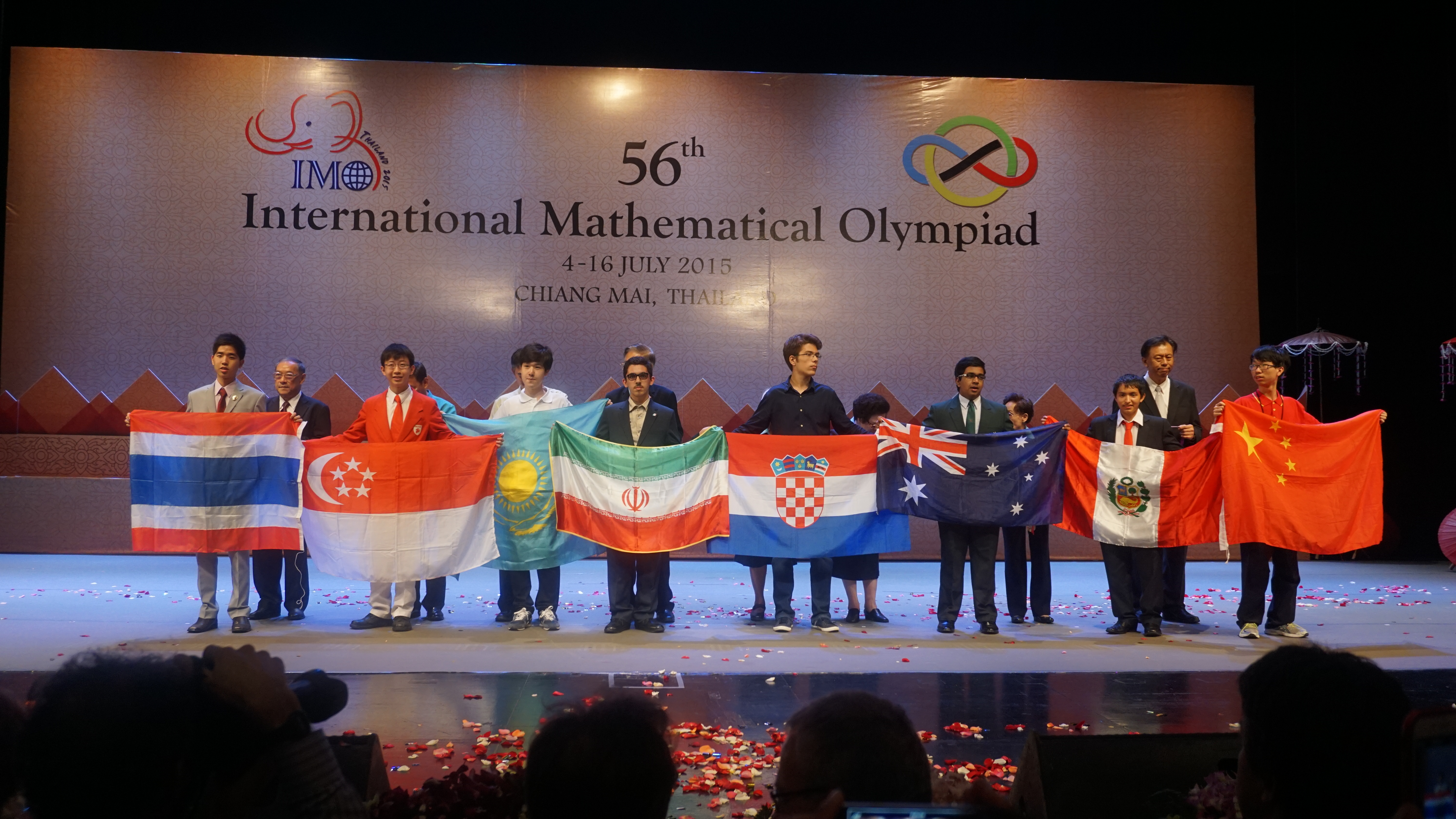
Some of gold medal contestants during the IMO 2015 closing ceremony, Chiang Mai Thailand

== History ==
The first IMO was held in Romania in 1959. Since then it has been held every year (except in 1980, when it was cancelled due to internal strife in Mongolia). It was initially founded for eastern European member countries of the Warsaw Pact, under the USSR bloc of influence, but later other countries participated as well. Because of this eastern origin, the IMOs were first hosted only in eastern European countries, and gradually spread to other nations.

Sources differ about the cities hosting some of the early IMOs. This may be partly because leaders and students are generally housed at different locations, and partly because after the competition the students were sometimes based in multiple cities for the rest of the IMO. The exact dates cited may also differ, because of leaders arriving before the students, and at more recent IMOs the IMO Advisory Board arriving before the leaders.

Several students, such as Lisa Sauermann, Peter Scholze, Reid W. Barton, Nicușor Dan (notably elected President of Romania in 2025) and Ciprian Manolescu have performed exceptionally well in the IMO, winning multiple gold medals. Others, such as Terence Tao, Artur Avila, Grigori Perelman, Ngô Bảo Châu, Peter Scholze and Maryam Mirzakhani have gone on to become notable mathematicians. Several former participants have won awards such as the Fields Medal.

Shortly after the 2016 International Mathematical Olympiad in Hong Kong, North Korean child prodigy Ri Jong-yol made his way to the South Korean consulate general, where he sought refuge for two months. Chinese authorities eventually allowed him to leave Hong Kong on a flight to Seoul.

The 61st IMO, scheduled to be held in St. Petersburg, Russia in 2020, was instead held virtually because of the COVID-19 pandemic, the first time this had occurred. The 62nd IMO in 2021 was also held virtually.

At the 2025 IMO, both OpenAI and Google DeepMind claimed that their systems could have achieved a gold-medal level performance in the competition. However, mathematicians including Terence Tao and Kevin Buzzard cautioned that these claims were not based on reproducible experimental conditions and reflected neither a fair comparison to the human competitors nor the sort of performance that would be needed for research-level mathematics. Journalists later revealed that the solutions submitted by OpenAI had not even been evaluated by the organization when the company announced its alleged "gold-medal level performance". Furthermore, when one of its solutions was evaluated it was deemed worthy of zero points because the chatbot “could guess the final result but not prove any part in a correct way”.

=== Penalties and bans ===
North Korea is the only country to ever be disqualified for cheating, once at the 32nd IMO in 1991 and again at the 51st IMO in 2010. However, the incident in 2010 was controversial. There have been other cases of cheating where contestants received penalties, although these cases were not officially disclosed. (For instance, at the 34th IMO in 1993, a contestant was disqualified for bringing a pocket book of formulas, and two contestants were awarded zero points on second day's paper for bringing calculators.)

Russia has been banned from participating in the Olympiad since 2022 as a response to its invasion of Ukraine. Nonetheless, a limited number of students (specifically, 6) are allowed to take part in the competition and receive awards, but only remotely and with their results being excluded from the unofficial team ranking. Slightly more than a half of the IMO 2021 Jury members (59 out of 107) voted in support of the sanction proposed by the IMO Board in an online voting in March 2022.

In May 2025, a letter signed by over 700 mathematicians, amongst whom are Fields Medal recipients and a former Israeli IMO contestant, has called on the IMO Board to suspend the membership of Israel in the 2025 IMO for its war crimes in Gaza in the same way as the Board did to Russia. The letter cites as one of the reasons that the Palestinian IMO team members were blocked by the Israeli authorities from leaving the country for the 2024 IMO. The president of the IMO Board has refused to act, claiming that the Jury may decide during the 2025 IMO. The letter, however, accuses him of preventing the Jury from discussing the issue during the 2024 IMO by invoking a newly-added obscure regulation.

=== National achievements ===
The following nations have achieved the highest team score in the respective competition:

- China, 26 times: in 1989, 1990, 1992, 1993, 1995, 1997, 1999 (joint), 2000–2002, 2004–2006, 2008–2011, 2013, 2014, 2019 (joint), 2020–2023, 2025-2026;
- Russia (including Soviet Union), 16 times: in 1963–1967, 1972–1974, 1976, 1979, 1984, 1986 (joint), 1988, 1991, 1999 (joint), 2007;
- United States, 9 times: in 1977, 1981, 1986 (joint), 1994, 2015, 2016, 2018, 2019 (joint), 2024;
- Hungary, 6 times: in 1961, 1962, 1969–1971, 1975;
- Romania, 5 times: in 1959, 1978, 1985, 1987, 1996;
- West Germany, twice: in 1982 and 1983;
- South Korea, twice: in 2012 and 2017;
- Bulgaria, once: in 2003;
- Iran, once: in 1998;
- East Germany, once: in 1968.

The following nations have achieved an all-members-gold IMO with a full team:

- China, 16 times: in 1992, 1993, 1997, 2000–2002, 2004, 2006, 2009–2011, 2019, 2021–2023, 2025.
- United States, 4 times: in 1994, 2011, 2016, and 2019.
- South Korea, 3 times: in 2012, 2017, and 2019.
- Russia, twice: in 2002 and 2008.
- Bulgaria, once: in 2003.

The only countries to have their entire team score perfectly in the IMO were the United States in 1994, China in 2022, and Luxembourg, whose 1-member team had a perfect score in 1981. The US's success earned a mention in TIME Magazine. Hungary won IMO 1975 in an unorthodox way when none of the eight team members received a gold medal (five silver, three bronze). The second-place team, East Germany, also did not have a single gold medal winner (four silver, four bronze).

The current ten countries with the best all-time results are as follows:

| Country | Appearances | Gold | Silver | Bronze | Honorable mentions |
|---|---|---|---|---|---|
| China | 40 | 197 | 37 | 6 | 0 |
| United States | 52 | 160 | 122 | 31 | 1 |
| Russia | 31 | 110 | 64 | 12 | 0 |
| South Korea | 39 | 102 | 87 | 28 | 8 |
| Hungary | 66 | 91 | 178 | 121 | 10 |
| Romania | 67 | 89 | 164 | 114 | 7 |
| Soviet Union (Note: The Soviet Union participated the IMO for the last time in 1991 due to the Dissolution of the Soviet Union. From 1992, former Soviet countries – including Russia – entered separately.) | 29 | 77 | 67 | 45 | 0 |
| Vietnam | 50 | 73 | 123 | 87 | 3 |
| United Kingdom | 59 | 61 | 126 | 136 | 18 |
| Bulgaria | 67 | 58 | 135 | 127 | 15 |

=== Individual achievements ===
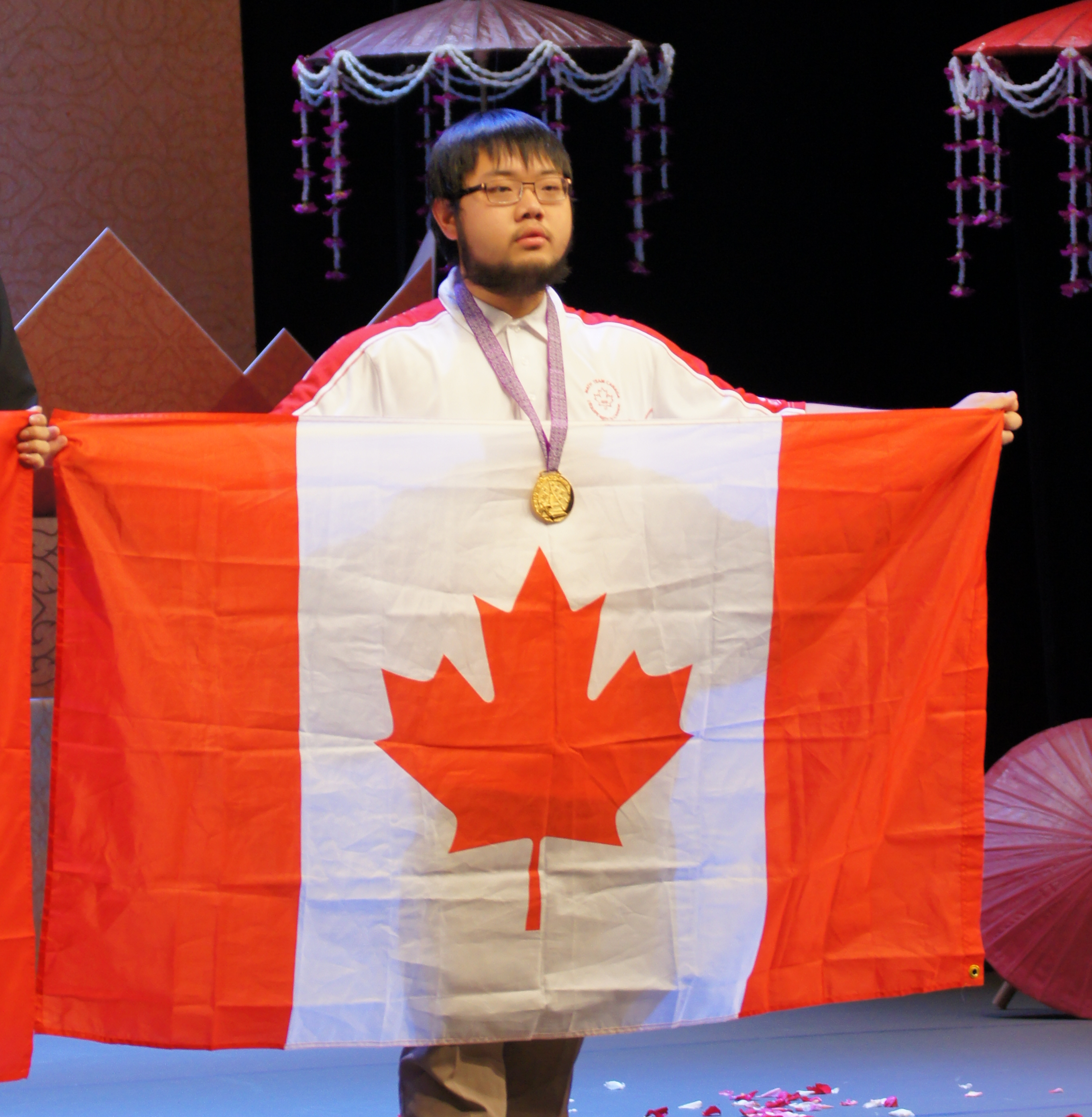
Zhuo Qun Song at the 2015 IMO

Several participants have achieved notable success at the International Mathematical Olympiad (IMO): Alex Chui (United Kingdom) is the most decorated IMO participant in history, having won five gold medals (including a perfect score in 2026) and two silver medals. Prior to 2026, Zhuo Qun Song (Canada) previously held the record for most gold medals, with five golds and one bronze (including a perfect score in 2015). Reid Barton (United States) was the first participant to win four gold medals (1998–2001). He is also one of ten four-time Putnam Fellows (2001–04). Seven participants in total have achieved four gold medals. Aside from Barton, these include: Christian Reiher (Germany): 2000–03 (also earned a bronze medal in 1999), Lisa Sauermann (Germany): 2008–11 (also earned a silver medal in 2007), Teodor von Burg (Serbia): 2009–12 (also earned a silver in 2008 and a bronze in 2007), Nipun Pitimanaaree (Thailand): 2011–14 (also earned a silver medal in 2009), Luke Robitaille (United States): 2019–22, and Alexander Wang (United States): 2023–26. Barton, Robitaille, and Wang are the only contestants to have won four gold medals without receiving any other medal color. Wolfgang Burmeister (East Germany), Martin Härterich (West Germany), Iurie Boreico (Moldova), and Lim Jeck (Singapore) are the only other participants besides Reiher, Sauermann, von Burg, and Pitimanaaree to win five medals with at least three of them gold. Ciprian Manolescu (Romania) managed to write a perfect paper (42 points) for gold medal more times than anybody else in the history of the competition, doing it all three times he participated in the IMO (1995, 1996, 1997). Manolescu is also a three-time Putnam Fellow (1997, 1998, 2000). Eugenia Malinnikova (Soviet Union) is the highest-scoring female contestant in IMO history. She has 3 gold medals in IMO 1989 (41 points), IMO 1990 (42) and IMO 1991 (42), missing only 1 point in 1989 to precede Manolescu's achievement.

Terence Tao (Australia) participated in IMO 1986, 1987 and 1988, winning bronze, silver and gold medals respectively. He won a gold medal when he just turned thirteen in IMO 1988, becoming the youngest person to receive a gold medal (Zhuo Qun Song of Canada also won a gold medal at age 13, in 2011, though he was older than Tao). Tao also holds the distinction of being the youngest medalist with his 1986 bronze medal, followed by 2009 bronze medalist Raúl Chávez Sarmiento (Peru), at the age of 10 and 11 respectively.

=== Gender gap and the launch of European Girls' Mathematical Olympiad ===
Over the years, since its inception to present, the IMO has attracted far more male contestants than female contestants. During the period 2000–2021, there were only 1,102 female contestants (9.2%) out of a total of 11,950 contestants. The gap is even more significant in terms of IMO gold medallists; from 1959 to 2021, there were 43 female (3.3%) and 1295 male gold medal winners.

This gender gap in participation and in performance at the IMO level led to the establishment of the European Girls' Mathematical Olympiad (EGMO).

== Media coverage ==
- A documentary, "Hard Problems: The Road To The World's Toughest Math Contest" was made about the United States 2006 IMO team.
- A BBC documentary titled Beautiful Young Minds aired July 2007 about the performance of British prodigy Daniel Lightwing taking part in the IMO and struggling with Asperger's syndrome. It inspired the BBC film X+Y (2014), a fictionalized version of Lightwing's story.
- A book named Countdown by Steve Olson tells the story of the United States team's success in the 2001 Olympiad.

== See also ==
- List of International Mathematical Olympiads
- International Mathematics Competition for University Students (IMC)
- International Science Olympiad
- List of mathematics competitions
- Pan-African Mathematics Olympiads
- Art of Problem Solving
- Mathcounts
