= Tiancheng Lou =

Chinese businessman and computer programmer

- 楼天城
- Born: 1986 (age 39–40); Jinan, Shandong, People's Republic of China
- Other name: ACRush
- Education: Tsinghua University
- Known for: Co-founder of pony.ai and achievements in competitive programming
- Awards: Codeforces peak rating 3047

Tiancheng Lou
- Traditional Chinese: 樓天城
- Simplified Chinese: 楼天城
Transcriptions
Standard Mandarin
- Hanyu Pinyin: Lóu tiānchéng

Tiancheng Lou (Chinese: 楼天城; pinyin: Lóu Tiānchéng; born 1986) is a Chinese businessman who is the co-founder and chief technology officer of Pony.ai, an autonomous vehicle technology company. He is also a competitive programmer whose achievements include winning the Google Code Jam twice in 2008 and 2009, winning the Topcoder Open Marathon in 2015 and being a gold medalist at the 2004 International Olympiad in Informatics, coming third overall. In terms of prize money won in major competitions, Lou is currently the most successful competitive programmer from China.

In 2017, Lou was included in the Innovators Under 35 list by MIT Technology Review magazine. In 2022, Business Insider named him as one of the 35 under 35 rising stars of the autonomous-vehicle industry.

== Early life and education ==
Lou was born in 1986 in Jinan, Shandong province. When he was in sixth grade of primary school, he moved to Hangzhou, Zhejiang province due to his parents' work. Both of his parents worked at Zhejiang University where his father was in the School of Public Affairs while his mother was in the Department of Chemistry.

Lou attended Hangzhou No. 14 High School where he graduated in 2004. In 2004, Lou came third place overall in the 2004 International Olympiad in Informatics where he won a gold medal. Due to his performance, he received a recommendation to attend Tsinghua University at the department of Computer Science and Technology.

Lou graduated from Tsinghua University in 2008 with a bachelor's degree in Computer science. After finishing his first degree, he joined the Institute for Theoretical Computer Science at Tsinghua University as a PHD candidate in 2008 and earned his PhD in 2012. Lou was part of the university team in the 2007 and 2009 International Collegiate Programming Contest which won second place both times.

== Career ==
After earning his PhD from Tsinghua University in 2012, Lou joined Google as an engineer and in 2015 worked in their autonomous vehicle team.

At the start of 2016, he left Google to work briefly at Quora and then Baidu.

In December 2016, he left Baidu along with Baidu colleague, James Peng (Chief Architect for Autonomous Driving), to found autonomous driving startup Pony.ai. As of 2018, Lou is the chief technology officer of the firm.

== Achievements ==
- International Olympiad in Informatics: Gold medal (third place overall in 2004)
- International Collegiate Programming Contest World Finals: 2 Gold medals (second place in 2007 and 2009)
- Google Code Jam: Champion (2008 and 2009)
- Facebook Hacker Cup: Second place (2022), Third place (2011 and 2012)
- Topcoder Open Algorithm: Second place (2010)
- TopCoder Open Marathon: Champion (2015), Second place (2013)
- Codeforces: Legendary Grandmaster (peak rating 3047)

A more comprehensive list of achievements can be found at the Competitive Programming Hall Of Fame website.

== Publications ==
- Zhao, Hengyu; Zhang, Yubo; Meng, Pingfan; Shi, Hui; Li, Li Erran; Lou, Tiancheng; Zhao, Jishen (22 May 2019). "Towards Safety-Aware Computing System Design in Autonomous Vehicles". arXiv:1905.08453 [cs.RO].
- Dong, Yuxiao; Tang, Jie; Chawla, Nitesh; Lou, Tiancheng; Yang, Yang; Wang, Bai (30 March 2015). "Inferring Social Status and Rich Club Effects in Enterprise Communication Networks". PLOS ONE. 10 (3) e0119446. arXiv:1404.3708. Bibcode:2015PLoSO..1019446D. doi:10.1371/journal.pone.0119446. ISSN 1932-6203. PMC 4379184. PMID 25822343.
- Tan, Haisheng; Yu, Jiajun; Liang, Hongyu; Lou, Tiancheng; Lau, Francis C. M. (12 April 2014). "Optimal Rendezvous Strategies for Different Environments in Cognitive Radio Networks". arXiv:1404.3265 [cs.NI].
- Liang, Hongyu; Lou, Tiancheng; Tan, Haisheng; Wang, Yuexuan; Yu, Dongxiao (6 January 2013). "On the Complexity of Connectivity in Cognitive Radio Networks Through Spectrum Assignment". arXiv:1301.0995 [cs.DS].
- Xiao, Jing; Lou, Tiancheng; Jiang, Tao (1 April 2012). "An Efficient Algorithm for Haplotype Inference". Algorithmica. 62 (3): 951–981. doi:10.1007/s00453-011-9494-5. ISSN 1432-0541. S2CID 2842127.
- Chen, Shiteng; Lou, Tiancheng; Papakonstantinou, Periklis; Tang, Bangsheng (11 August 2011). "Width-parameterized SAT: Time-Space Tradeoffs". arXiv:1108.2385 [cs.CC].

== See also ==
- Pony.ai
- International Olympiad in Informatics
- Gennady Korotkevich
- Petr Mitrichev
- Makoto Soejima
