= Andrew He =

American computer programmer

- Born: 1997 (age 28–29); California, United States
- Other name: ecnerwala
- Education: MIT
- Known for: Achievements in competitive programming
- Awards: Codeforces peak rating: 3843
- Website: www.github.com/ecnerwala

Andrew He (born 1997) is an American competitive programmer and the winner of the 2021 Facebook Hacker Cup.

== Background ==
He was born in 1997. Starting from sixth grade, he participated in various mathematics competitions such as the American Mathematics Competitions, the American Invitational Mathematics Examination, the United States of America Mathematical Olympiad and HMMT. In many of them, he placed in the top 20 overall. He attended the Math Olympiad Program.

He attended Monta Vista High School in Cupertino, California from 2011 to 2015. During his time there, he started competitive programming in 2012. He won two gold medals at the International Olympiad in Informatics (IOI) in 2014 and 2015.

He attended Massachusetts Institute of Technology, where he graduated in 2019 with a Bachelor of Science in Math and Computer science. He was part of the MIT team which participated in the International Collegiate Programming Contest that won a silver medal in 2016, coming sixth place overall, and then a gold medal in 2019, coming in second place overall.

He has achieved significant success in competitive programming, where he won the 2021 Facebook Hacker Cup. Other accomplishments include winning the 2017 Distributed Code Jam, achieving third place in the Facebook Hacker Cup in 2018 and 2020, achieving third place in the Google Code Jam in 2019 and 2020 and being runner-up in the 2020 Topcoder Open Algorithm contest.

He currently works at Cognition AI, an artificial intelligence company founded by IOI gold medalists.

== Achievements ==
=== Competitive programming ===
A more comprehensive list of achievements can be found at the Competitive Programming Hall Of Fame website.

- International Olympiad in Informatics: 2 Gold (2014 and 2015) (Third place overall in 2015)
- International Collegiate Programming Contest (Representing MIT): 1 Gold (2019) (Second place overall) and 1 Silver (2016) (Sixth place overall)
- Facebook Hacker Cup: Champion (2021), Third place (2018 and 2020)
- Google Code Jam: Third place (2019 and 2020)
- Distributed Code Jam: Champion (2017)
- Topcoder Open Algorithm: Second place (2020), Third place (2022)
- TopCoder Open Marathon: Champion (2015), Second place (2013)
- Codeforces: Legendary Grandmaster (peak rating 3843)

=== Mathematics ===
- Mathcounts (Representing California): Team champion (2011)
- United States of America Mathematical Olympiad: Winner (2013)
- Romanian Master of Mathematics and Sciences: Silver (12th place overall)
- HMMT: Champion (2015)
- William Lowell Putnam Mathematical Competition: 2016 (Top 25), 2017 (Top 15), 2018 (Honorable mention)

== Publications ==
- Hao, Steven; He, Andrew; Li, Ray; Wu, Scott (September 4, 2014). "An Elementary Proof of the Cayley Formula Using Random Maps". arXiv:1409.1614 [math.CO].
- Wu, Scott; Li, Ray; He, Andrew; Hao, Steven (December 14, 2013). "A Simple Proof of the Cayley Formula using Random Graphs". arXiv:1312.4096 [math.CO].
