= Gennady Korotkevich =

Belarusian competitive programmer (born 1994)

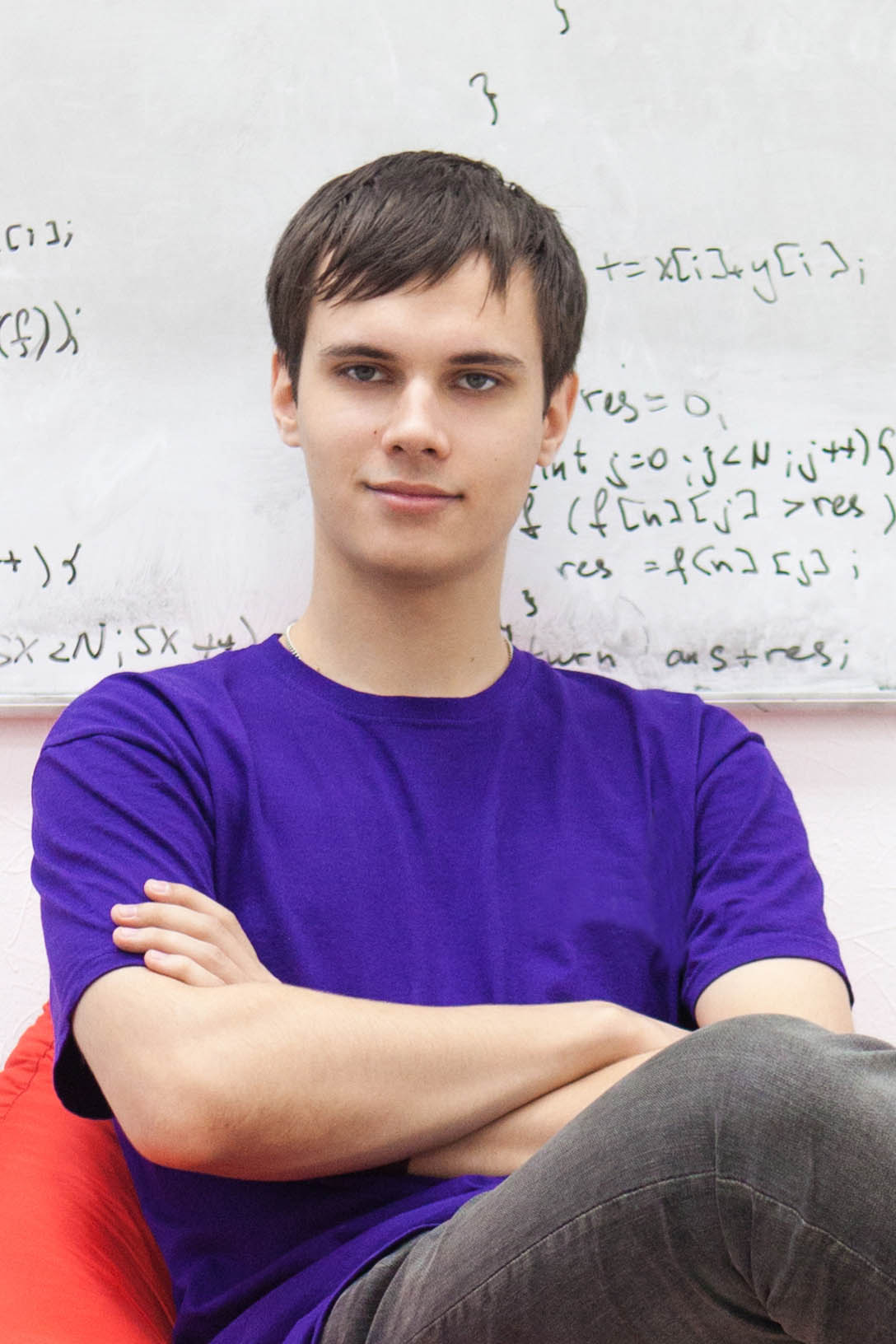
- Korotkevich in 2014
- Born: September 25, 1994 (age 32); Gomel, Belarus
- Other name: tourist (Codeforces handle)
- Education: ITMO University
- Known for: Programming prodigy; highly ranked sport programmer from an early age.
- Awards: Codeforces peak rating 4009 (30 August 2024)

Gennady Korotkevich (Belarusian: Генадзь Караткевіч, Hienadź Karatkievič, Russian: Геннадий Короткевич; born 25 September 1994) is a Belarusian competitive sport programmer who has won major international competitions since the age of 11, as well as numerous national competitions. Widely regarded as the greatest competitive sport programmer of all time, his top accomplishments include six consecutive gold medals in the International Olympiad in Informatics as well as the world championship in the 2013 and 2015 International Collegiate Programming Contest World Finals. As of October 2023, Korotkevich is the highest-rated programmer on CodeChef, Topcoder, AtCoder and HackerRank. On 30 August 2024, he achieved a historic rating of 4009 on Codeforces, becoming the first to break the 4000 barrier.

== Biography ==
Korotkevich was born in Gomel (Homiel), southeastern Belarus. His parents, Vladimir and Lyudmila Korotkevich, are programmers in the mathematics department at Francysk Skaryna Homiel State University. At age 6, he became interested in his parents' work. When he was 8, his father designed a children's game he could use to learn programming.

His mother consulted departmental colleague Mikhail Dolinsky, who gave Korotkevich a small book to read. Dolinsky, one of the top computer science teachers in Belarus, recalled, "A month went by, and then another one... No news from Gena. Then suddenly Lyudmila comes by and brings me a programming notebook: when summer and football were over, her son sat at the computer. As a second-grader at a national competition, he took second place, which gained him an automatic entry into a technical university without taking any entrance exams. Somehow he solved the problem of a body immersed in water. At that time, Gena didn't even know about Archimedes' principle of buoyancy."

Korotkevich first gained global attention when he qualified for the 2006 International Olympiad in Informatics (IOI) at the age of 11, a world record by a large margin.

He took the silver medal at his first IOI event and received gold medals from 2007 to 2012. To date, he is the most successful competitor in IOI's history.

At the 2009 IOI in Plovdiv, the then 14-year-old Korotkevich said of his success, "I try various [strategies], and one of them is the right one. I am no genius. I am simply good at it." He said he spent no more than three to four hours each day at the computer, and his preferred hobbies are football and table tennis.

In the fall of 2012, he moved to Russia to attend ITMO University. In the summer of 2013, he helped ITMO defeat Shanghai Jiao Tong University and the University of Tokyo to win the 37th International Collegiate Programming Contest World Finals, held in St. Petersburg. He also won the annual Google Code Jam from 2014 to 2020.

In a 2014 interview, Korotkevich said he was unsure of his career plans after graduation, saying he'd focus on his education and possibly go into science.

In a 2017 interview, Korotkevich said he had received job offers from Google and Yandex, but that he had turned them down and would instead continue with his degree in computer science at ITMO.

In 2019, Korotkevich was a PhD student at ITMO.

On August 30, 2024, Korotkevich became the first to break the 4000 Elo barrier on Codeforces. Before this, the highest rating category was thought to be "Legendary Grandmaster" achieved at rating 3000, for which users would be rewarded by having the first letter of their handle turn black and the rest of the handle red. On August 30, Korotkevich revealed the rating category above "Legendary Grandmaster": the category "Tourist", named after Korotkevich's own handle. The handle coloring of this category is an inverted "Legendary Grandmaster" Nutella coloring—the first letter red and the rest of the name black. Only one user has reached the category "Tourist" after Korotkevich; that is "jiangly", whose category is now "Jiangly."

Korotkevich currently works at Cognition AI, an artificial intelligence company founded by IOI gold medalists.

== Career achievements ==
A more comprehensive list of achievements can be found at the Competitive Programming Hall Of Fame website.

- Facebook Hacker Cup: 2014, 2015, 2019, 2020, 2023 2025 winner
- Topcoder Open: 2018, 2019 Marathon Match Champion, 2014, 2019, 2020, 2021 Algorithm Champion
- Google Hash Code: champion 2019, 2020 and 2021 2nd place - Team name- Past Glory
- Google Code Jam: 2014 champion, 2015 champion, 2016 champion, 2017 champion, 2018 champion, 2019 champion, 2020 champion, 2021 6th place and 2022 champion
  - In Round 1B of the 2012 Google Code Jam, he achieved a perfect score in just 54 minutes, 41 seconds from the start of the contest.
- Yandex.Algorithm: 2010, 2013, 2014, 2015 winner, 2017 winner and 2018 winner
- Yandex Cup: 2020 winner
- Russian Code Cup (by Mail.Ru Group): 2016 winner, 2015 runner-up, 2014 winner, 2013 runner-up
- ACM-ICPC World Finals: 2013 winner (team) and 2015 winner (team)
- Kotlin Challenge: 2014 winner
- International Olympiad in Informatics: He won absolute first place in 2009, 2010, 2011; a gold medal in 2007 (20th place), 2008 (7th place) and 2012 (2nd place); a silver medal in 2006 (26th place). Currently he holds the record for quantity of gold medals (six) and absolute first places (three).
- All-Russian Team Olympiad in Informatics: 2007, 2009, 2010 and 2011 winner and 2008 runner-up
- Topcoder High School Competition: 2010 winner, 2009 runner-up
- Snarknews Winter Series: 2010, 2011, 2012, 2013, 2014 and 2015 winner
- Snarknews Summer Series: 2008, 2010, 2011 runner-up and 2012, 2013, 2014 winner
- Vekua Cup: 2013 winner (team)
- CROC Championship: 2013 and 2016 winner
- Internet Problem Solving Contest: 2011 winner (team), 2013 winner (team) and 2017 winner (team)
- Challenge24: 2013 and 2014 runner-up (team)
- Marathon24: 2015 3rd place (team)
- Deadline24: 2016 3rd place (team), 2017 winner (team) and 2018 winner (team)
- In 2015, he participated at IMC and was awarded a gold medal, ranking 47 as individual, and 10th position as a member of ITMO University team.
- Code Festival Grand Final: Code Festival Final 2016 2nd place (individual), Code Festival Final winner 2017 (individual)
- Bioinformatics Contest: 2017 and 2019 winner, 2018 3rd place.
- ICFP Programming Contest: 2021 winner (team)

Codechef Snackdown :

- Codechef Snackdown 2016 Winner (team)
- Codechef Snackdown 2019 winner (team)

Codeforces powered tournaments

- Rockethon — 2014, 2015 winner
- ZeptoCodeRush - 2014 third place, 2015 winner
- Looksery Cup — 2015 winner
- VK Cup: 2012 3rd place (individual), 2015 winner (team), 2016 1st place (team).

== See also ==
- Central European Olympiad in Informatics
- Online judge
- Petr Mitrichev
- Makoto Soejima
