= Andrey Lopatin =

Russian programmer

- Андрей Сергеевич Лопатин
- Born: 1981 (age 44–45); St Petersburg
- Occupation: Programmer
- Known for: VKontakte, Telegram, two golds at ICPC

Andrey Lopatin (Russian: Андре́й Серге́евич Лопа́тин) is a Russian programmer, one of the main founders of VKontakte social network and Telegram messenger, two times world champion in competitive programming, 2009 Topcoder Open winner, coach of the SPBU competitive programming team since 2006.

== Early years ==
Andrey Lopatin was born in St Petersburg into a family of teachers. He studied at the famous Physics and Mathematics Lyceum No. 239, but the last year he finished at the school No. 238 in an experimental class where the kids were taught Latin, Ancient Greek, philosophy, oriental studies and ancient culture. In the 1990s he saw computers for the first time, he tried to code in Basic following the advice he read in a book. In the 8th grade he tried creating first programs in Assembler. He actively participated in computer science competitions, at one of which he met Nikolay Durov, Pavel Durov's elder brother.

After school, Lopatin entered SPBU where he got interested in algorithms. As a student, together with his friends Nikolay Durov and Oleg Eterevsky, Lopatin hacked into the network of ICPC organizers and sent messages to all participants, which led to disqualification of the team. In 2000 and 2001, together with Nikolai Durov, Lopatin won the ICPC. They were coached by Natalya Voyakovskaya, Senior Lecturer at the SPBU Faculty of Information Technology and Programming.

In 2009, Lopatin won the Topcoder Open.

== Career ==
Around 2008, in the early stages of the development of VKontakte, Nikolai and Pavel Durov invited Lopatin to join the team, he worked with Nikolai on code development and system optimisation. As the company grew bigger, he took the post of vice technical director.

Lopatin began working on the Telegram protocol in 2012 and became head of the company's Russian legal entity, but was fired by Pavel Durov in October 2014.

In 2015, he headed development team at VeeRoute.

== Teaching and coaching ==
Lopatin is hailed as one of the world's most gifted programmers. In 2006, he went to work at SPBU Mathematics and Mechanics faculty. After Voyakovskaya retired, Lopatin took over as coach of the SPBU competitive programming team and lead it to XI place at ICPC in 2008. In 2014 and 2016, his team won the championship.

In 2022, the team led by Lopatin took third place at the ICPC.

== Private life ==
Lopatin is married, the couple has two kids.
