= Codeforces =

Competitive programming website

- Website type: Competitive programming
- Available in: English, Russian
- Country of origin: Russia
- Owner: Mikhail Mirzayanov
- Creator: Mikhail Mirzayanov
- Website: codeforces.com
- Users: 1.7 million (2024 estimate)
- Launched: April 10, 2009
- Current status: Active

Codeforces (Russian: Кодфорсес, sometimes written as CF) is a website (founded 2009) that hosts competitive programming contests. It is maintained by a group of competitive programmers from ITMO University led by Mikhail Mirzayanov. Since 2013, Codeforces claims to surpass TopCoder (founded 2001, which also has a significant competitive programming component) in terms of active contestants. Codeforces along with other similar websites are used by some sport programmers, like Gennady Korotkevich, Petr Mitrichev, Benjamin Qi and Makoto Soejima, and by other programmers interested in furthering their careers.

== Overview ==
Codeforces is a platform where people generally practice competitive programming and it offers the following features:

- Short (2-hours) contests, called "Codeforces Rounds", held about once a week
- Educational contests (2-2.5 hours, with 12 hours (24 hours before Round 45) hacking period), held 2-3 times per month;
- Challenge/hack other contestants' solutions;
- Solve problems from previous contests for training purposes;
- "Polygon" feature for creating and testing problems;
- Social networking through internal public blogs.

Codeforces non-official vectorized main logo.(Without sponsors)

== Rating system ==
Contestants are rated by a system similar to Elo rating system. There are usually no prizes for winners, though several times a year special contests are held, in which top-performing contestants receive T-shirts. Some bigger contests are hosted on Codeforces base, among them "The Lyft Level 5 Challenge 2018", provided by Lyft or "Microsoft Q# Coding Contest — Summer 2018" provided by Microsoft.

Contestants are divided into ranks based on their ratings. Since May 2018, users with ratings between 1900 and 2099 can be rated in both Div. 1 and Div. 2 contests. At the same time, Div. 3 was created for users rated below 1600. There is also a Div. 4, which is for users rated below 1400.

Rating range	Title	Division
≥ 4000	eponym	1
3000 — 3999	Legendary Grandmaster	1
2600 — 2999	International Grandmaster	1
2400 — 2599	Grandmaster	1
2300 — 2399	International Master	1
2100 — 2299	Master	1
1900 — 2099	Candidate Master	1/2
1600 — 1899	Expert	2
1400 — 1599	Specialist	2/3
1200 — 1399	Pupil	2/3/4
≤ 1199	Newbie	2/3/4

During the period of time when the user tourist (Gennady Korotkevich) had a rating of >4000, he was given the title "tourist"; likewise, during the time when the user jiangly (Lingyu Jiang) had a rating of >4000, he was given the title "jiangly".

== History ==
Codeforces was created by a group of competitive programmers from Saratov State University led by Mike Mirzayanov. It was originally created for those interested in solving tasks and taking part in competitions. The first Codeforces Round was held on February 19, 2010 with 175 participants. As of the end of November 2025, over 1000 rounds were held, with over 11000 registered competitors per round on average. Before 2012, Codeforces Rounds were titled "Codeforces Beta Rounds" to indicate that the system was still under development.

== Academic use ==
Codeforces is recommended by many universities. According to Daniel Sleator, professor of Computer Science at Carnegie Mellon University, competitive programming is valuable in computer science education, because competitors learn to adapt classic algorithms to new problems, thereby improving their understanding of algorithmic concepts. He has used Codeforces problems in his class, 15-295: Competition Programming and Problem Solving. At the National University of Singapore, Codeforces rating is also used as an entrance qualifying criterion for registering for a 4-unit course, CS3233 Competitive Programming, as students have to achieve a rating of at least 1559 to be able to register for the course.

== See also ==
- CodeChef
- CodeFights
- Competitive programming
- Facebook Hacker Cup
- Google Code Jam
- HackerRank
- International Collegiate Programming Contest
- ja:AtCoder
- LeetCode
- Online judge
- SPOJ
- Topcoder
- UVa Online Judge

== External sources ==
- Official website
