= Petr Mitrichev =

Russian sport programmer

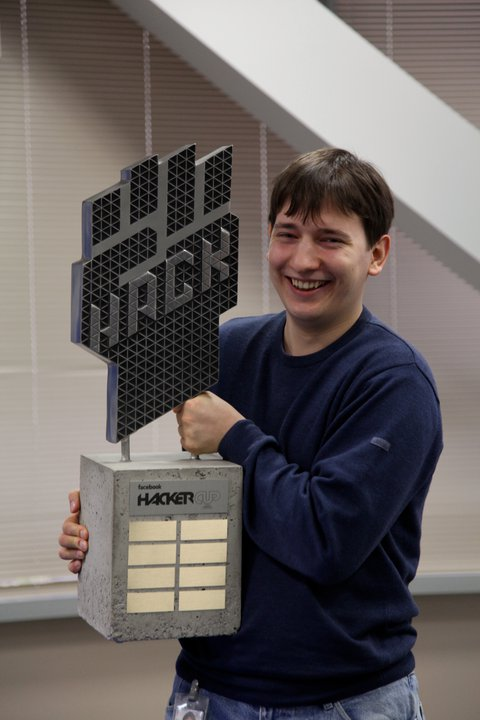
- Petr Mitrichev after winning the Facebook Hacker Cup 2011
- Born: 19 March 1985 (age 41); Moscow, Russia
- Education: Moscow State University
- Known for: Various competitive programming achievements
- Awards: Codeforces peak rating 3597 (July 2016)
- Website: https://petr-mitrichev.blogspot.com/

Petr Mitrichev (born 19 March 1985) is a Russian competitive programmer who has won multiple major international competitions. His accomplishments include gold (2000, 2002) and silver (2001) medals in the IOI, gold medals (2003, 2005) in the ACM ICPC World Finals as part of the team of Moscow State University and winning Google Code Jam (2006), the Topcoder Open (2018, 2015, 2013, 2006), the Topcoder Collegiate Challenge (2006, 2007), Facebook Hacker Cup (2011, 2013, 2017) as well as numerous national and online contests. He has achieved the highest rating ever among the Algorithm competitors of Topcoder and consistently ranks in the top two of the world. He is the second highest rated Algorithm coder on Topcoder ratings as of February 2021. He currently works at Google on the search engine and helped to prepare Code Jam, until the program was discontinued in 2023.

== Early life ==
At the age of 10, he started reading a lot of mathematical books and discovered that he had a special interest towards math. He soon became fond of solving mathematical problems and puzzles. His teacher, Julia Lvovna Vorontsova noticed his keen interest in programming and invited him to attend the Computer Science Olympiad of the Northwestern District of Moscow, where he took fourth place, which qualified him for the Moscow programming Olympiad. At that same Moscow programming olympiad in 1997, Petr took sixth place. He participated in six Russian National programming olympiads for high school students, and won three of them – in 2000, 2001 and 2002. He also participated in six summer training camps and five winter training camps for the Russian IOI team.

== Competitive programming achievements ==
A more comprehensive list of achievements can be found at the Competitive Programming Hall Of Fame website.

- Mitrichev boasts an unprecedented 100+ wins in Single Round Matches at Topcoder as of June 14, 2015.
- In 2013 he won MemSQL startcup.
- He won the Russian Code Cup in 2011, 2013 and 2015 and was the runner-up in 2014.
- In 2011, 2013 and 2017 he won the Facebook Hacker Cup.
- In 2011 he won the Yandex.Algorithm.
- In 2011 and 2013 his team won the Internet Problem Solving Contest.
- He won the Topcoder Collegiate Challenge in 2006 and 2007.
- He won the Google Code Jam in 2006 after placing third in 2005.
- Two times Runner up in ACM International Collegiate Programming Contest World Finals.
- He won gold medals in the International Olympiad in Informatics twice, in 2000 and 2002, and silver medal in 2001.
- He won the All-Russian Olympiad in Informatics in 2000, 2001 and 2002.
- Topcoder Open Algorithm Champion in 2018, 2015, 2013, 2006.
- Challenge24 winner in 2012 and 2013
- All-Syberian Olympiad Winner in 2004
- Snarknews Winter Series winner in 2007, 2008 and 2009
- Snarknews Summer Series winner in 2007, 2008, 2009, 2010 and 2011
- Kotlin Challenge runner-up in 2014

=== Other competitive achievements ===
- 2017 HC Champion of Championnat International de Jeux Mathématiques et Logiques

== See also ==
- International Science Olympiad
- ACM International Collegiate Programming Contest
- Central European Olympiad in Informatics
- Online judge
- Gennady Korotkevich
- Makoto Soejima
