= Meta Hacker Cup =

International programming competition organized by Meta Platforms

- Status: Active
- Frequency: Annually
- Country: Worldwide
- Years active: 2011–present
- Inaugurated: 2011
- Most recent: September 22 - December 9, 2023
- Attendance: 20,324 (2023)
- Budget: $20,000 for winner, smaller prizes for runners-up
- Organiser: Meta Platforms
- Website: https://www.facebook.com/codingcompetitions/hacker-cup/

Meta Hacker Cup (formerly known as Facebook Hacker Cup) is an annual international programming competition hosted and administered by Meta Platforms. The competition began in 2011 as a means to identify top engineering talent for potential employment at Meta Platforms. The competition consists of a set of algorithmic problems which must be solved in a fixed amount of time. Competitors may use any programming language and development environment to write their solutions.

Facebook Hacker Cup is part of a circuit of annual international programming contests that included Google Code Jam, Topcoder Open, and the ACM International Collegiate Programming Contest. It has been featured in articles from Bloomberg and Stack Overflow.

== Past winners ==
Tournament	Finals location	1st place	2nd place	3rd place
2025	Online	(Belarus) Gennady Korotkevich	(Japan) Yui Hosaka	(United States) Benjamin Qi
2024	Online	(China) Ziqian Zhong	(Japan) Yui Hosaka	(Poland) Mateusz Radecki
2023	Online	(Belarus) Gennady Korotkevich	(United States) Benjamin Qi	(Ukraine) Alexey Danilyuk
2022	Online	(United States) Benjamin Qi	(China) Tiancheng Lou	(Poland) Marek Sokolowski
2021	Online	(United States) Andrew He	(Ukraine) Alexey Danilyuk	(China) Lingyu Jiang
2020	Online*	(Belarus) Gennady Korotkevich	(United States) Benjamin Qi	(United States) Andrew He
2019	Dublin, Ireland	(Belarus) Gennady Korotkevich	(Russia) Mikhail Ipatov	(Russia) Petr Mitrichev
2018	Menlo Park, California, United States	(Russia) Mikhail Ipatov	(Japan) Makoto Soejima	(United States) Andrew He
2017	Seattle, Washington, United States	(Russia) Petr Mitrichev	(South Korea) Park Sung Gwan	(Russia) Mikhail Ipatov
2016	London, United Kingdom	(Japan) Makoto Soejima	(China) Yuhao Du	(Taiwan) Ting-Wei Chen
2015	Menlo Park, California, United States	(Belarus) Gennady Korotkevich	(Ukraine) Dmytro Soboliev	(Russia) Gleb Evstropov
2014	Menlo Park, California, United States	(Belarus) Gennady Korotkevich	(Poland) Tomasz Czajka	(Japan) Makoto Soejima
2013	Menlo Park, California, United States	(Russia) Petr Mitrichev	(Poland) Jakub Pachocki	(Poland) Marcin Smulewicz
2012	Menlo Park, California, United States	(Russia) Roman Andreev	(Poland) Tomasz Czajka	(China) Tiancheng Lou
2011	Menlo Park, California, United States	(Russia) Petr Mitrichev	(Vietnam) Khúc Anh Tuấn	(China) Tiancheng Lou

- Since 2020, Hacker Cup Finals was moved to an online format in response to the COVID-19 pandemic.

== Results by country ==
Country	1st place	2nd place	3rd place
Belarus	6	0	0
Russia	5	1	3
(United States) USA	2	2	3
Japan	1	3	1
China	1	2	3
Poland	0	3	3
Ukraine	0	2	1
South Korea	0	1	0
Vietnam	0	1	0
Taiwan	0	0	1

== See also ==
- Google Code Jam
- Online judge
- Topcoder Open
