= Andrey Stankevich =

Russian competitive programming coach

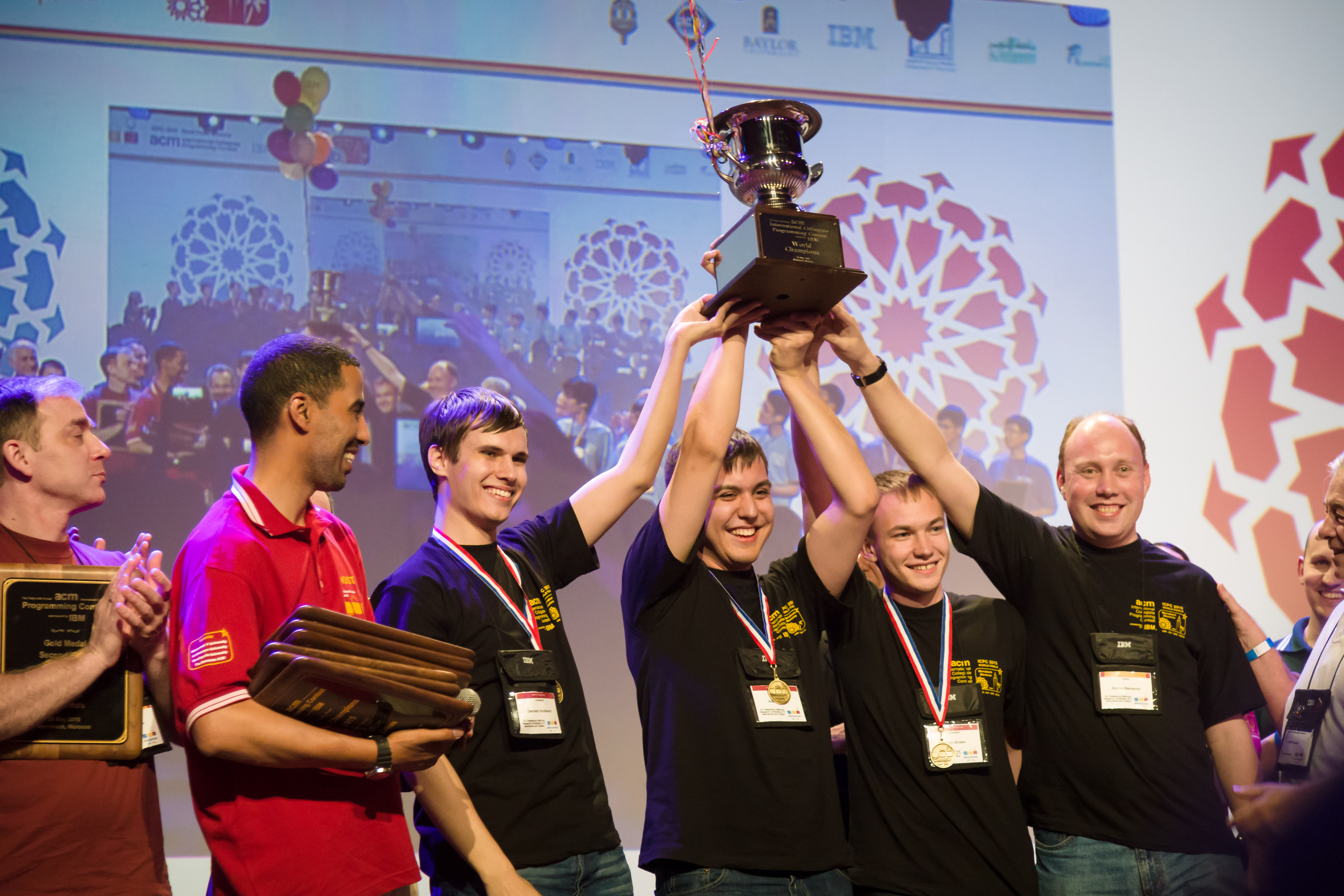
- ITMO University students winning ACM-ICPC, Andrey Stankevich on the right
- Occupation: associate professor
- Known for: sport programming coach

Andrey Stankevich (Russian: Андрей Сергеевич Станкевич) is a competitive programming coach. ITMO University has won 8 gold, 1 silver and 1 bronze medal in ACM ICPC under his coaching. Andrey Stankevich is an associate professor at ITMO's Information Technologies and Programming Faculty, a laureate of the President of the Russian Federation Award in Education, a laureate of ACM-ICPC Founder’s Award 2004, and ACM ICPC Senior Coach Award 2016.

== Achievements as a contestant ==
- Google Code Jam: third place in 2006
- ACM ICPC: Silver medal in 2000 and Gold medal in 2001
