= Pony.ai =

Autonomous vehicle technology company

Pony AI Inc.
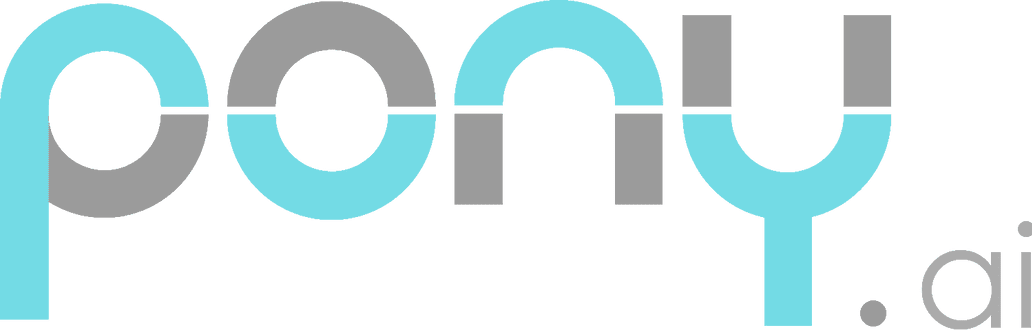

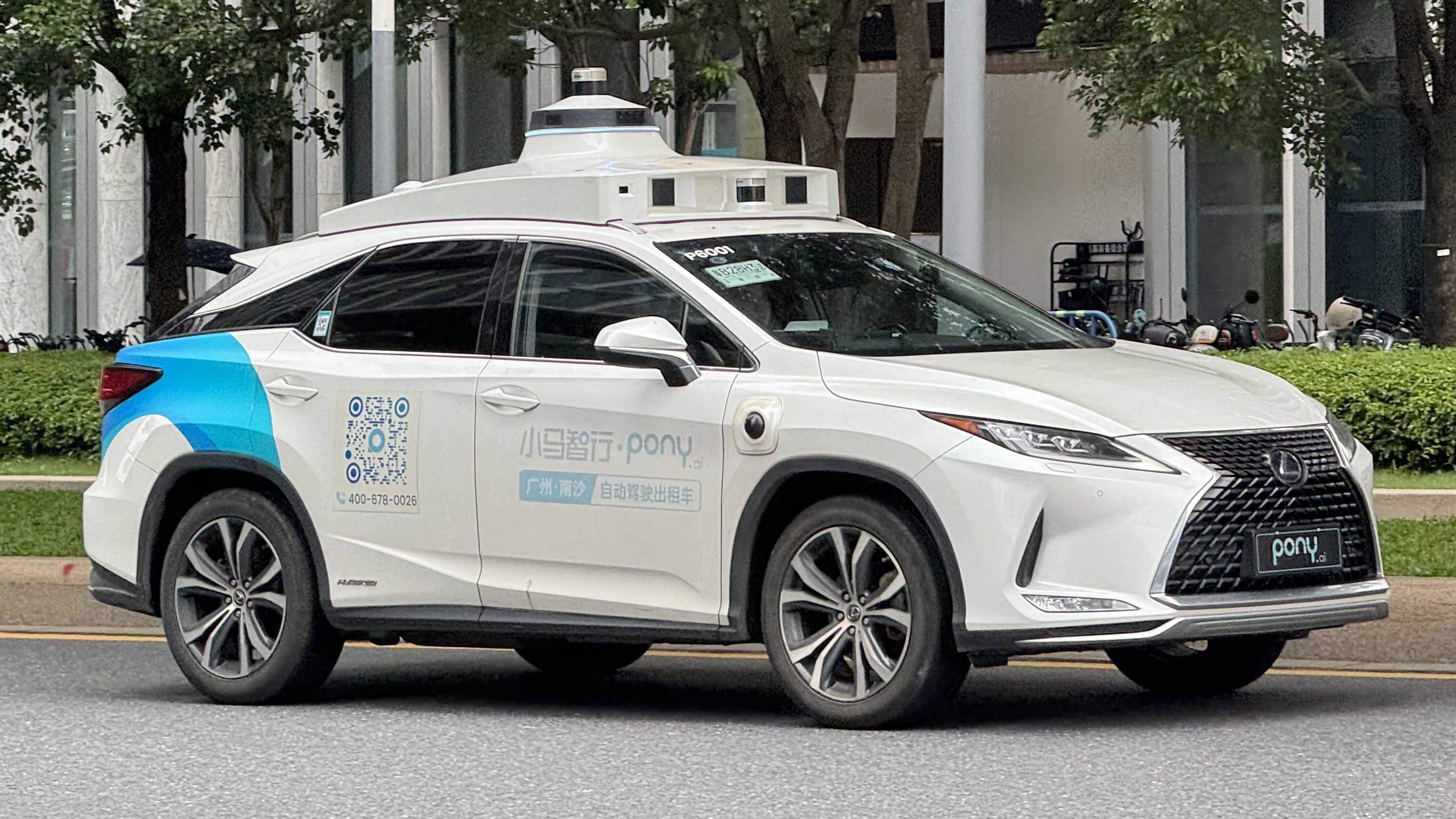
- A Pony.ai Lexus RX450h in Shenzhen
- Type: Public
- Traded as: Nasdaq: PONY; SEHK: 2026
- Industry: Autonomous vehicles
- Founded: December 2016; 9 years ago
- Founders: James Peng; Tiancheng Lou
- Headquarters: Guangzhou, Guangdong, China (headquarters as of 2025); Fremont, California, U.S.
- Key people: James Peng (CEO); Tiancheng Lou (CTO)
- Revenue: ▲US$90.0 million (2025)
- Net income: ▲ −US$134 million (2025)
- Number of employees: 1,300 (2024)
- Website: pony.ai

Pony AI Inc. (Chinese: 小马智行; pinyin: Xiǎomǎ Zhìxíng) is a Chinese autonomous vehicle technology company co-located in Silicon Valley, Beijing, and Guangzhou.

== History ==
The company was founded in December 2016 by James Peng and Tiancheng Lou, formerly software developers for Baidu in Silicon Valley.

The company has partnered with equipment manufacturers such as Toyota. Pony.ai obtained permits to run fully driverless ride-hailing services in Beijing and Guangzhou, China.

In April 2019, Pony.ai launched a pilot system covering 50 km^{2} (19 sq mi) in Guangzhou for employees and invited affiliates, serving pre-defined pick-up points.

In November 2019, the company started a three-month trial in Irvine, California, with 10 cars and defined stops for pick-up and drop-off. In February 2021, Brunei Investment Agency participated in a $100 million funding series round for Pony.ai.

In May 2021, the California Department of Motor Vehicles (DMV) permitted Pony.ai to test six autonomous vehicles without human safety drivers on specified streets in Fremont, Milpitas and Irvine. The permit restricts operation to roads with speed limits not exceeding 45 miles per hour (72 km/h) in clear weather and light precipitation. Testing was planned to start in Fremont and Milpitas on weekdays between 10 a.m. and 3 p.m. In June 2021, testing began in Fremont and Milpitas.

On October 28, a Pony.ai vehicle operating in autonomous mode hit a road center divider and a traffic sign in Fremont after turning right. In December 2021, California DMV suspended a driverless testing permit for Pony.ai following this accident. It is the first time for DMV to issue such a suspension. Subsequently, the National Highway Traffic Safety Administration (NHTSA) launched a probe. More than four months after the accident, the NHTSA announced the "first recall of an automated driving system" as the company complied with the government agency’s request. In May 2022, California DMV revoked Pony.ai's permit for failing to monitor the driving records of the safety drivers on its testing permit. By June 2023, Pony.ai was back to testing its fleet with safety drivers present in California.

According to the California DMV, in 2021 Pony.ai had the third-highest number of miles driven, behind Waymo and Cruise.

In April 2022, Pony.ai became the first autonomous driving company to get a taxi license in China.

In July 2022, Pony.ai partnered with equipment manufacturer Sany Heavy Industry to mass produce autonomous driving trucks in China.

In April 2023, Pony.ai was licensed to operate robotaxi services in Guangzhou.

In August 2023, Toyota and Pony.ai developed plans to mass produce robotaxis in China. The two companies and GAC-Toyota, a venture between the Japanese automaker and Chinese state-owned Guangzhou Automobile Group, will invest more than 1 billion yuan ($140 million) combined.

In April 2025, Pony.ai partnered with Tencent Cloud and Smart Industries Group, the cloud business division of Tencent Holding, to advance autonomous driving technology.

As of June 2025, Pony AI was testing autonomous big trucks (with a safety driver) on a highway between Beijing and the Port of Tianjin. Around that time, Reuters reported estimates that "Pony AI lets one person monitor as many as a dozen" of its robotaxis at the same time, with analysts polled by LSEG estimating that the company could become profitable by 2029 (after still incurring over $200 million in losses in 2024).

In November 2025, Pony.ai announced its partnership with Bolt, as they aim to deploy driverless cars as part of Bolt's taxi services in Europe.

On 10 December 2025, Pony.ai announced its expansion into Singapore after partnering with the country's largest transport operator ComfortDelGro. This is part of their global expansion strategy.

== Services ==
Service areas
Country	City	Status	Launch date	Ref.
China	Beijing	Full commercial service	April 28, 2022	
China	Guangzhou	Full commercial service	April 26, 2023	
China	Shanghai	Service announced	—	
China	Shenzhen	Full commercial service	2024	
Croatia	Zagreb	Service announced	—	
Qatar	Doha	Service announced	—	
Singapore		Service announced	—	
United Arab Emirates	Dubai	Service announced	—	
United Kingdom	London	Service announced	—	
United Kingdom	Manchester	Service announced	—	

== Financing ==
In January 2018, Pony.ai completed a $112 million Series A round co-led by Morningside Venture Capital and Legend Capital with seed round lead-investor Sequoia China and investor IDG Capital also participating in the round, alongside Hongtai Capital, Legend Star, Puhua Capital, Polaris Capital, DCM Ventures, Comcast Ventures and Silicon Valley Future Capital.

In February 2020, Toyota invested $400 million in the company as part of a funding round of $462 million. Toyota previously announced that it was working with Pony.ai to test self-driving cars on public roads in Beijing and Shanghai.

In 2020, the company had a valuation of $5.3 billion.

The company intended to go public on the New York Stock Exchange via an SPAC route. However, in 2021, the company suspended its plans due to Chinese regulators.

In October 2023, Pony.ai received $100 million from Neom, Saudi Arabia, to develop, manufacture and deploy autonomous vehicles and smart infrastructure in Neom and the MENA region. The agreement includes the establishment of a regional R&D and manufacturing headquarters.

In November 2024, Pony.ai held its initial public offering (IPO) and became a listed company on the Nasdaq raising $260 million. This is one of the largest IPOs in the United States stock market involving autonomous driving sector. Shares opened around 15% above their offer price on their market debut.

In June 2025 Pony.ai was added to the Nasdaq Golden Dragon China Index.

In November 2025, Pony.ai held a secondary listing on the Hong Kong Stock Exchange.

== See also ==
- List of unicorn startup companies
- Robotaxi
- Apolong
