= International Conference on Functional Programming =

Annual academic conference in the field of computer science

The International Conference on Functional Programming (ICFP) is an annual academic conference in the field of computer science sponsored by the ACM SIGPLAN, in association with IFIP Working Group 2.8 (Functional Programming). The conference focuses on functional programming and related areas of programming languages, logic, compilers and software development.

The ICFP was first held in 1996, replacing two biennial conferences: the Functional Programming and Computer Architecture (FPCA) and LISP and Functional Programming (LFP). The conference location alternates between Europe and North America, with occasional appearances in other continents. The conference usually lasts 3 days, surrounded by co-located workshops devoted to particular functional languages or application areas.

The ICFP has also held an open annual programming contest since 1998, called the ICFP Programming Contest.

== History ==
- 2012: 17th ACM SIGPLAN International Conference on Functional Programming in Copenhagen, Denmark (General Chair: Peter Thiemann, University of Freiburg; Program Chair: Robby Findler, Northwestern University)

== See also ==
Related conferences

- PLDI: Programming Language Design and Implementation
- POPL: Principles of Programming Languages

Related journals

- Journal of Functional Programming
- Higher-Order and Symbolic Computation
- ACM Transactions on Programming Languages and Systems
