= Makoto Soejima =

Japanese sport programmer

- 副島 真
- Born: 1991 (age 34–35)
- Other name: rng_58
- Education: The University of Tokyo
- Known for: Achievements in competitive programming as well as in international science olympiads
- Awards: Codeforces peak rating 3115

Makoto Soejima (副島 真, Soejima Makoto; born 1991) is a Japanese former competitive programmer. He is one of three people to have won both the Google Code Jam and the Facebook Hacker Cup and the only one to have also won a gold medal with a perfect score at the International Mathematical Olympiad (IMO). In International Science Olympiads, he has won three gold medals and one bronze in the International Mathematical Olympiad as well as two silver medals in the International Olympiad in Informatics (IOI).

== Biography ==
Soejima was born in 1991. He began competitive programming in 1999. He attended Junior and Senior High School at Komaba, University of Tsukuba. During his time at junior and senior high school, he participated in the IMO multiple times (2005, 2007–2009) where he obtained three gold medals and one bronze. On his final attempt in 2009, he achieved a perfect score. At the same time, Soejima also participated in the 2008 and 2009 IOI where he obtained a silver medal both times.

Soejima then attended The University of Tokyo where he studied mathematics. He was part of the university team in the 2013 and 2015 International Collegiate Programming Contest which won third place both times. Soejima also attended the Graduate School of Information Science and Technology at The University of Tokyo.

Soejima's other significant achievements in competitive programming include winning the 2011 Google Code Jam, winning the 2016 Facebook Hacker Cup, and being Topcoder Open Algorithm champion in 2010, 2011 and 2016.

In December 2020, Soejima retired from competitive programming. By 2021 Soejima worked at AtCoder, a company that organizes programming competitions.

== Achievements ==
=== Competitive programming ===
A more comprehensive list of achievements can be found at the Competitive Programming Hall Of Fame website.

- International Olympiad in Informatics: 2 Silver (2008, 2009)
- International Collegiate Programming Contest World Finals: 2 Gold medals (third place in 2013 and 2015)
- Google Code Jam: Champion (2011), Second place (2019 and 2015), Third place (2018)
- Facebook Hacker Cup: Champion (2016), Second place(2018), Third place (2014)
- TopCoder Open: Algorithm champion (2016, 2011 and 2010)
- Codeforces: Legendary Grandmaster (peak rating 3115)

=== Mathematics ===
International Mathematical Olympiad: 3 Gold (2007, 2008, 2009 (Perfect Score)) and 1 Bronze (2005)

== Publications ==
- Kawamura, Akitoshi; Soejima, Makoto (November 2020). "Simple strategies versus optimal schedules in multi-agent patrolling". Theoretical Computer Science. 839: 195–206. arXiv:1411.6853. doi:10.1016/j.tcs.2020.07.037. S2CID 221494351.

== See also ==
- International Mathematical Olympiad
- List of International Mathematical Olympiad participants
- International Olympiad in Informatics
- Gennady Korotkevich
- Petr Mitrichev
