= PC² =

PC² is the Programming Contest Control System developed at California State University, Sacramento in support of Computer Programming Contest activities of the ACM, and in particular the ACM International Collegiate Programming Contest. It was used to conduct the ACM ICPC World Finals in 1990 and from 1994 through 2009. In 2010, the ACM ICPC World Finals switched to using Kattis, the KTH automated teaching tool; however, PC^{2} continues to be used for a large number of ICPC Regional Contests around the world.

== Computer programming contests and PC² ==
Computer programming contest have rules and methods for judging submissions. The following describes in a general way a contest where PC^{2} is used.

A computer programming contest is a competition where teams submit (computer program) solutions to judges. The teams are given a set of problems to solve in a limited amount of time (for example 8-13 problems in 5 hours). The judges then give pass/fail judgements to the submitted solutions. Team rankings are computed based on the solutions, when the solutions were submitted and how many attempts were made to solve the problem. The judges test in a Black box testing where the teams do not have access to the judges' test data.

PC^{2} manages single or multi-site programming contests. It provides a team a way to log in, test solutions, submit solutions and view judgements from judges. PC^{2} provides judges a way to request team solutions (from a PC^{2} server) run/execute the solution and enter a judgment. The PC^{2} scoreboard module computes and creates standings and statistics web pages (HTML/XML). PC^{2} is easy to install on Linux/Linux-like systems and MS Windows and does not require super-user (root) access to install it or use it: this makes it an attractive choice for users who may not have super-user access.

== Usage and User Experiences ==
PC^{2} was used for the ACM International Collegiate Programming Contest World Finals from 1994 to 2009. It has also been used in hundreds of ICPC Regional Contests around the world. It has been used continuously by the ACM Pacific Northwest Regional Contest since 1989, as well as by many other ICPC Regional Contests including the Africa and Arabia Regional Contests, numerous Regional Contests in Asia, and several Regional Contests in the U.S. It remains today the single most widely used Contest Control System for ICPC Regional Contests.

PC^{2} has been used by the Africa and Arabia Collegiate Programming Contest (ACPC) every year since its inception more than 25 years ago. ACPC comprises a set of Regional Contests, including the separate Saudi, Nigerian, Oman, South Africa, Togolese, Moroccan, Kuwait, Algerian, Jordanian, Palestinian, Qatar, Beninese, Egyptian, Lebanese, Ethiopian, Tunisian, Bahrain, Sudanese, Syrian, and Angolan Collegiate Programming Contests. Every one of these Regional/National Contests uses PC^{2}; many of the Regional Contests are fed by sub-regional contests, all of which also use PC^{2}. The winners at each Regional Contest advance to the ACPC Championship, which also uses PC^{2}. ACPC also sponsors a variety of additional contests, including "ACPC Kickoff", "ACPC for Girls", "ACPC for Teens", and "ACPC for Seniors"; again, all of these contests also use PC^{2}.

The ICPC (formerly ACM) Greater New York Regional Programming Contest in North America has been using PC^{2} for over 20 years. Greater New York has used PC^{2} many different ways over the years including single site, multi-site and the Web-based team client. The judges in the Greater New York region prefer PC^{2} over other Contest Control Systems since it gives them the greatest flexibility in judging contestant submissions. Submissions may be judged manually or using computer auto-judging. Often, the judges prefer to judge some problems manually, and PC^{2} provides this capability. In addition, the PC^{2} development team has quickly responded to questions and help with any issues that came up.

PC^{2} has been in use by the ACM Mid-Atlantic Programming Contest for several years. In earlier years, systems administrators had limited success with the program due to its distributed nature. Each of the contest sites ran a PC^{2} server which needed to initiate and accept Java RMI. Using a central datacenter in the fall of 2005 revealed no problems. In 2014, PC^{2} crashed 3:45h into the contest, preventing teams from obtaining receipts for their submissions. Judges were unable to retrieve submissions - the contest ended without announcing a winner. It took one week to try to recover those submissions. A similar failure occurred in 2016. System administrators had decided to deploy a web add-on to PC^{2} which then failed under load. The contest start time was delayed by 90 minutes. Teams were unable to submit problems and the contest director scrambled to find a work-around that let teams save problems with a time stamp to be considered later. In 2013, system operators failed to enter the correct team names, leaving teams without information about the standings in the contest (the scoreboard). System operators were unable to correct the team names during the contest. Because of these incidents, organizers of the region are now considering moving to an alternative system, such as Kattis, which is the official system used by ACM for the ICPC World Finals.

With the introduction of version 9 (socket-based version) delays, most firewall issues with version 8 have been addressed.

== A brief revision history ==
Version	Year	Main Features	Implementation Language
1.0	1989	Initial Release MS-DOS, floppy disk communication	Turbo Pascal
2.0	1990	Multi-site via Kermit	Turbo Pascal
4.2B	1994	LAN support	Turbo Pascal
6.1	1996	Windows version	Visual Basic
7.0	1998	Windows, FreeBSD, or Linux; Java RMI communication	IBM VisualAge for Java
8.0	2004	Complete code rewrite	Eclipse Java
9.0	2008	Single Site Admin, Improved security and configuration control, socket-based communication	Java
9.1	2009	Automated Judging, Run/Clar Filtering, External API, ICPC Data Importing, Native LAF	Java
9.2	2012	Non-GUI Server, Security Improvements, Admin control of Servers, New configuration options, Report Generation	Java
9.3	2015	Contest configuration via YAML, CLICS Event Feed generator, Contest Profile switching, Web Interface, support for Multiple Test Cases and Large Data Files, Non-GUI Judge, Command-line Run Submission, Embedded webserver providing support for CLICS JSON scoreboards, new Configuration Options	Java
9.4	2016	Improved contest configuration importing; support for automatic contest starting; expanded REST Web Services	Java
9.5	2017	Support for CLICS Input and Output Validators; Additional REST Web Services; Enhanced API functionality; Non-GUI Scoreboards	Java
9.6	2019	"Proxy" support for firewalled servers; support for contest problem "groups"; improvements to judging pipeline; increased support for interaction with ICPCTools; improved support for contest configuration using YAML files; support for JSON event feed output	Java
9.7	2021	PC2 is now OPEN SOURCE, at GitHub, with full documentation at the PC2 Web Page and the PC2 Wiki; support for user GUI customization; completely new Web Team Interface which eliminates the requirement to use an existing web server; automatic handling of scoreboard freeze operations; support for (so-called) "shadow mode"; further improvements to the judging pipeline and to YAML configuration support; improved support for ICPC "CLICS" specifications for Contest APIs	Java
9.8	2022	Support for team name formatting on scoreboard; significant upgrades to "shadow mode" support; enhancements to Web Team Interface; ability to merge sample and secret data files; fixes and upgrades to Event Feeder web services for additional CLICS compatibility; improvements in performance and GUI layouts; support for additional Admin editing facilities.	Java

== See also ==
- ACM International Collegiate Programming Contest
- Online Judge

== Other uses ==
- PC² is the abbreviation of the Paderborn Center for Parallel Computing, an institute of the Paderborn University, Germany (http://www.upb.de/pc2)
