= Google Code Jam =

Programming competition hosted by Google

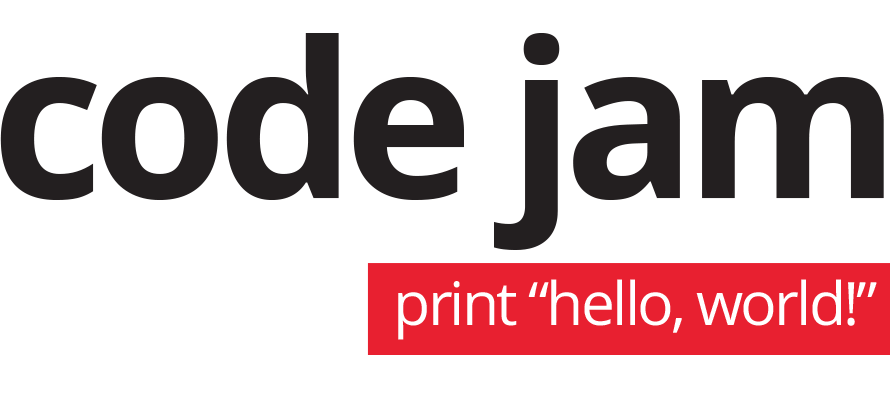
- Status: Discontinued
- Frequency: Annually
- Venue: Online
- Country: Worldwide
- Years active: 2003–2022
- Inaugurated: 2003
- Attendance: 35,500 (2019)
- Budget: $15,000 for winner, smaller prizes for runners-up
- Patron: Google
- Website: https://codingcompetitions.withgoogle.com/codejam (shut down on July 1, 2023)

Google Code Jam was an international programming competition hosted and administered by Google. The competition began in 2003. The competition consists of a set of algorithmic problems which must be solved in a fixed amount of time. Competitors may use any programming language and development environment to obtain their solutions. From 2003 to 2007, Google Code Jam was deployed on Topcoder's platform. Since 2008 Google has developed their own dedicated infrastructure for the contest.

Between 2015 and 2018, Google also ran Distributed Code Jam, with the focus on distributed algorithms. This was run in parallel with the regular Code Jam, with its own qualification and final round, for a top prize of $10,000, but was only open for people who qualified to Round 2 of Code Jam (up to 3,000 people).

Several Google Code Jam problems have led to academic research.

On February 22, 2023, Google announced that Code Jam was to be discontinued alongside their other programming competitions, Hash Code and Kick Start. A series of four "farewell rounds" took place on April 15, 2023 from 14:00 until 18:00 UTC, with all rounds taking place at the same time. Login functionality for Google's programming competitions was disabled on June 1, 2023, followed by the shut down of the competitions' hosting platform exactly one month later, on July 1, 2023. A permanent archive of all Code Jam, Hash Code and Kick Start problems is available for download on GitHub.

== Past winners ==
=== Google Code Jam ===
Tournament	Finals location	Registrants	Qual Advancers	1st place	2nd place	3rd place
2022	Online		28,111	(Belarus) Gennady Korotkevich	(China) Jiang Lingyu	(Canada) Kevin Sun
2021	Online	93,000	25,961	(China) Xiuhan Wang	(Japan) Shogo Murai	(United States) Scott Wu
2020	Online (Note: Originally scheduled to take place in Munich, Germany, but later was converted to online format in response to the COVID-19 pandemic.)	96,000	30,221	(Belarus) Gennady Korotkevich	(Canada) Kevin Sun	(United States) Andrew He
2019	San Francisco, United States	74,000	27,610	(Belarus) Gennady Korotkevich	(Japan) Makoto Soejima	(United States) Andrew He
2018	Toronto, Canada	62,000	14,093	(Belarus) Gennady Korotkevich	(Poland) Kamil Debowski	(Japan) Makoto Soejima
2017	Dublin, Ireland	64,000	18,331	(Belarus) Gennady Korotkevich	(Russia) Konstantin Semenov	(Russia) Vladislav Epifanov
2016	New York City, United States	58,520	22,154	(Belarus) Gennady Korotkevich	(Philippines) Kevin Atienza	(Russia) Egor Kulikov
2015	Seattle, United States	56,749	12,438	(Belarus) Gennady Korotkevich	(Japan) Makoto Soejima	(South Africa) Bruce Merry
2014	Los Angeles, United States	49,066	20,595	(Belarus) Gennady Korotkevich	(Russia) Evgeny Kapun	(China) Yuzhou Gu
2013	London, United Kingdom	45,754	17,059	(Belarus) Ivan Metelsky	(Ukraine) Vasil Bileckiy	(Russia) Vladislav Isenbaev
2012	New York City, United States	20,613	15,692	(Poland) Jakub Pachocki	(United States) Neal Wu	(Slovakia) Michal Forišek
2011	Tokyo, Japan	21,940	10,336	(Japan) Makoto Soejima	(Belarus) Ivan Metelsky	(Poland) Jakub Pachocki
2010	Dublin, Ireland	12,092	8,308	(Russia) Egor Kulikov	(Netherlands) Erik-Jan Krijgsman	(Russia) Sergey Kopeliovich
2009	Mountain View, United States	10,000	7,516	(China) Tiancheng Lou	(China) Zichao Qi	(Japan) Yoichi Iwata
2008	Mountain View, United States	11,044	6,774	(China) Tiancheng Lou	(China) Zeyuan Zhu	(South Africa) Bruce Merry
2006	New York City, United States		?	(Russia) Petr Mitrichev	(China) Ying Wang	(Russia) Andrey Stankevich
2005	Mountain View, United States		?	(Poland) Marek Cygan	(Netherlands) Erik-Jan Krijgsman	(Russia) Petr Mitrichev
2004	Mountain View, United States		?	(Argentina) Sergio Sancho	(United States) Po-Ru Loh	(United States) Reid Barton
2003	Mountain View, United States		?	(Sweden) Jimmy Mårdell	(Canada) Christopher Hendrie	(Russia) Eugene Vasilchenko

=== Distributed Code Jam ===
Tournament	Finals location	Competitors	1st place	2nd place	3rd place
2018	Toronto, Canada	?	(Poland) Mateusz Radecki	(Philippines) Kevin Atienza	(Poland) Tomasz Czajka
2017	Dublin, Ireland	3,000	(United States) Andrew He	(Russia) Evgeny Kapun	(Netherlands) Erik-Jan Krijgsman
2016	New York City, New York, United States	3,000	(South Africa) Bruce Merry	(China) Yuzhou Gu	(Czech Republic) Filip Hlasek
2015	Seattle, Washington, United States	3,000	(South Africa) Bruce Merry	(Poland) Marcin Smulewicz	(Taiwan) Ting Wei Chen

== Results by country ==
Country	1st place	2nd place	3rd place
Belarus	9	1	0
China	3	4	1
Russia	2	2	7
Poland	2	1	1
Japan	1	3	2
Argentina	1	0	0
Sweden	1	0	0
(United States) USA	0	2	4
Canada	0	2	1
Netherlands	0	2	0
Philippines	0	1	0
Ukraine	0	1	0
South Africa	0	0	2
Slovakia	0	0	1

== See also ==
- Google Code
- Online judge
- Topcoder Open
