= ICFP Programming Contest =

Programming Contest

The ICFP Programming Contest is an international programming competition held annually around June or July since 1998, with results announced at the International Conference on Functional Programming.

Teams may be of any size and any programming language(s) may be used. There is also no entry fee. Participants have 72 hours to complete and submit their entry over the Internet. There is often also a 24-hour lightning division.

The winners reserve "bragging rights" to claim that their language is "the programming tool of choice for discriminating hackers". As such, one of the competition's goals is to showcase the capabilities of the contestants' favorite programming languages and tools. Previous first prize winners have used Haskell, OCaml, C++, Cilk, Java, F#, and Rust.

The contests usually have around 300 submitted entries.

== Traditions ==
A notable tradition of the ICFP Programming Contest is the release of elaborate pre-contest teasers designed to spark excitement and speculation within the community. These often take the form of cryptic "spoilers" or narrative puzzles that engage teams long before the official start.

A standout example is the 2011 contest, where a small image of books adorned with the Greek letter lambda-displayed on the contest website - was subtly modified to be much larger than its visual content suggested. Labeled with the hint "What’s in an image?", the file was discovered to have a ZIP archive appended to it. When extracted, the archive revealed a Java JAR file containing a program. Running this program generated a second image, which itself contained another embedded ZIP/JAR, creating a self-referential loop. Hidden within this intricate Easter egg was a crucial clue to the year's challenge.

Another legendary instance was the 2020 contest, which featured a fictional storyline centered on the Pegovka Observatory, where a Russian astronomer named Ivan Zaitsev was said to be receiving mysterious alien signals. This unfolding narrative was shared through blog posts and videos, building anticipation by presenting the incoming data as part of an immersive sci-fi mystery.

These creative, meta-level puzzles exemplify the contest's spirit of intellectual playfulness and technical ingenuity. In other years, organizers have similarly warmed up the community with cryptic images, themed tweets, or subtle references to past contests, such as recurring characters or inside jokes, reinforcing a strong sense of continuity and shared culture among participants.

== Past tasks ==
Year	Organiser	Description
1998	Université de Montréal and Massachusetts Institute of Technology	Write a program that plays pousse, an odd variant of tic-tac-toe. Contestant programs were entered into a tournament to determine the first- and second-place program.
1999	Harvard University	Size-optimize case statements (the contest task spoke about text-based adventure games, but in fact the task was to size-optimize the description of such a game).
2000	Cornell University	Implement a ray tracer using a Postscript-like syntax.
2001	INRIA Rocquencourt	Size-optimize an HTML-like markup language by removing unnecessary whitespace and tags, and so on.
2002	OGI School of Science and Engineering	Implement robots playing a Sokoban-like game one against each other.
2003	Chalmers University	Implement robots driving a car as fast as possible through different racing tracks.
2004	University of Pennsylvania	Design an ant colony that will bring the most food particles back to its anthill, while fending off ants of another species. The contest entry would output a state-machine description of the ant: in principle, entries could have been written by hand. Later the task was adapted into Ant Wars, a strategy and programming game where each participant is a species of ant. The participants then, in a language called Antomata, program a finite-state machine to function as the brain of each ant. The ant brain then controls the ant to find and collect food to bring to the home ant hill, to fend off attackers or make trails of pheromones.
2005	PLT group	Implement "bots" for a "Cops & Robbers" game: contestants have to write the control program that guides a Robber-Bot through a quiet urban neighborhood on a mission to rob every bank without getting caught, and the control program for a Cop-Bot dedicated to stopping it.
2006	Carnegie Mellon University	Implement a virtual machine that runs an operating system (called UMIX) provided by the judges, and crack it using new programming languages with unconventional syntax and semantics, such as 2D and a version of BASIC using Roman numerals. Many puzzles were tiny versions or parodies of previous contests.
2007	Utrecht University	Implement a 2-stage virtual machine that executes a DNA-like string to produce an image. Then, given an input string for this machine, find a prefix that when added to this string yields an image as close as possible to the given target image.
2008	Portland State University and the University of Chicago	Provide a Mars rover control system that will guide it to a home base while avoiding obstacles and enemies.
2009	University of Kansas	Control a satellite to move between specified orbits and rendezvous with other satellites.
2010	Leipzig University of Applied Science, Germany	International Car and Fuel Production.
2011	Tohoku University, Japan	Program a computer with 256 "slots" to outlast its opponent in terms of slots remaining at the end of the match. Submissions include executables that are entered into a two-phase tournament.
2012	University of St Andrews, Scotland	Program an AI for a Boulder Dash-like game.
2013	Microsoft Research	Guess the implementation of a blackbox function implemented in a simple functional language through querying a web service.
2014	University of Oxford and Well-Typed LLP	Write AI programs for a pacman like game, in SECD machine instruction for pacman and 8-bit machine assembly instructions for four ghosts.
2015	Galois	Write an AI for Tetris-like game on a hexagon grid field that embeds secret phrases in the move sequence.
2016	University of Electro-Communications	Write an AI to solve abstract origami.
2017	University of Edinburgh	Write an AI for a game where players in turn claim route parts on the map and the one with the best coverage wins. There are also three extensions to the main game mode, any number of which can be enabled on a map.
2018	Rochester Institute of Technology	Generate nanobot traces to construct, destruct, and reconstruct target 3D objects while minimizing energy used.
2019	Yale-NUS College and National University of Singapore	Worker-Wrappers against Bit Rot. The task is to program a robot called a worker-wrapper to efficiently wrap the entire accessible surface of a mine, transforming it into a safe storage site for obsolete software. The robot moves across a grid-based map, using its manipulators to wrap surface squares, while navigating around obstacles and utilizing collected boosters to improve efficiency. Players must generate a sequence of actions—such as moving, turning, or using boosters like extended manipulators, fast wheels, or a drill—to complete the wrapping in minimal time. Solutions are scored based on the time taken relative to the best solution, with shorter wrapping times yielding higher scores.
2020	SKB Kontur	Build virtual machine by the alien specification, run alien provided game-server on that VM, explore the game (2D space battle on the planet orbit with Chebyshev distance, with accelerate, shoot, split and detonate commands), reverse engineer game-protocol and create bot to play this game.
2021	Alex Lang and Jasper Van der Jeugt	Manipulate a 2D stick figure, where vertices are connected by flexible edges, to fit through a polygonal hole as in the "Brain Wall" game show. The goal is to minimize the sum of squared distances from each hole vertex to the nearest figure vertex ("dislikes"), while respecting physical constraints on edge stretching. Special bonuses can be unlocked by placing vertices at specific locations, allowing relaxed rules such as breaking edges or global stretch tolerance.
2022	Alperen Keles	Develop algorithms for robotic painters tasked with transforming an initial canvas into a target image using a sequence of geometric and color operations. The core problem involved manipulating rectangular blocks on a 2D canvas through five types of moves—line cut, point cut, color, swap, and merge—each with an associated cost based on block size and operation type. Participants submitted programs in an Instruction Set Language (ISL), aiming to minimize the total cost while maximizing visual similarity to the target painting, measured via pixel-wise RGBA differences.
2023	Aymeric Fromherz	Optimize the placement of musicians on a stage to maximize audience enjoyment. Each attendee has individual musical preferences, and their happiness depends on the proximity to and volume of musicians playing their preferred instruments, while sound can be blocked by other musicians or obstacles like pillars. The task involves solving a complex spatial optimization problem under physical and geometric constraints. Additional extensions introduce factors such as musician collaboration effects and adjustable volume levels to further refine the performance quality.
2024	Jeroen Bransen, Matúš Tejiščák, Bas den Heijer, Emiel Bransen, Aymeric Fromherz	The contest centered around a custom functional language called ICFP, based on lambda calculus and serialized in a compact ASCII format. Participants submitted programs that evaluated to specific string outputs, solving a series of increasingly complex challenges. The contest featured four main problem types: "lambdaman" (pathfinding in mazes with size-optimized code), "spaceship" (trajectory control via thrust manipulation), "3d" (programming in a 2D grid-based language with time-travel semantics), and "efficiency" (analyzing and evaluating deeply nested programs, often requiring symbolic reasoning or SAT solvers).
2025	Liam O’Connor, Jack Stodart	Develop algorithms to map a labyrinthine library composed of rooms with six doors by planning exploratory expeditions. Teams must submit route plans to navigate the library and collect partial information about room labels, recorded as 2-bit values. The goal is to reconstruct the entire layout as an undirected graph using as few expeditions as possible.
2026	Nolen Royalty, Eliot Hedeman, Henry Nelson, Frank Chiarulli Jr	Solve a set of optimization problems by writing programs in "littleman", a two-dimensional esoteric programming language designed for the contest. Littleman programs emphasise spatial reasoning: instructions are executed by "little men" that physically walk over the program's source code, and data is exchanged through pipes the programmer draws into the source. The organisers stated that the task was deliberately designed so that running an unattended AI agent for the full 72 hours would not be a winning strategy. Contestants could also build solutions by hand in a browser-based editor.

== Prizes ==
Prizes have a modest cash value, primarily aimed at helping the winners to attend the conference, where the prizes are awarded and the judges make the following declarations:

First prize
[Language 1] is the programming tool of choice for discriminating hackers.
Second prize
[Language 2] is a fine programming tool for many applications.
Third prize
[Language 3] is also not too shabby.
Winner of the lightning division
[Language L] is very suitable for rapid prototyping.
Judges' prize
[Team X] are an extremely cool bunch of hackers.

Where a winning entry involves several languages, the winners are asked to nominate one or two. The languages named in the judges' declarations have been:

Year	First Prize	Second Prize	Third Prize	Lightning
1998	Cilk	OCaml		
1999	OCaml	Haskell		
2000	OCaml	OCaml		
2001	Haskell	Dylan		
2002	OCaml	C		
2003	C++	C++		OCaml
2004	Haskell	Haskell and C++		Java and C++
2005	Haskell	Dylan	Haskell	
2006	2D	D	Assembly	
2007	C++	Perl		
2008	Java			ML
2009	C++	Java		ML
2010	C++, Haskell, Python			SageMath
2011	F#	Shell and C++		
2012	C++	OCaml		Java
2013	Java, C#, C++, PHP, Ruby and Haskell	C++ and Python	C#, C++, bash, awk, sed and Excel	C++
2014	Haskell	C++	Perl	OCaml
2015	C++, Java, C#, PHP, Ruby and Haskell	C++, Python, JavaScript	C++	C++
2016	Java, C++, C#, PHP, Haskell	C++, Ruby, Python, Haskell, Java, JavaScript		OCaml
2017	C++	C++		OCaml
2018	Rust	C++, Python, Ruby, JavaScript, bash and SQL		OCaml
2019	Rust	C++		C++ and Haskell
2020	Python	C++ (first winner), Rust (second winner)		Haskell
2021	C++, Rust	Rust	Rust, TypeScript and Go	Rust, TypeScript and Go
2022	Rust, Go and Python	Rust, C++ and Python	C++, Rust and Python	Rust, C++ and Python

== See also ==
- International Collegiate Programming Contest (ICPC)
- Online judge
