= Hash Code (programming competition) =

Team programming competition organized by Google

- Status: Inactive
- Frequency: Annually
- Venue: Online
- Country: Worldwide
- Years active: 2014–2022
- Inaugurated: 2014
- Most recent: 2022
- Attendance: 128,000 (2021)
- Patron: Google
- Website: https://codingcompetitions.withgoogle.com/hashcode

Hash Code was a global team programming competition organized by Google. The participants work in teams of 2–4 people solving a programming challenge inspired by software engineering at Google. The first edition was a local event at the Google office in Paris, with 200 participants in attendance. Since then, the competition expanded globally, and reached over 128,000 registered participants in the 2021 edition. The competition consists of a qualification round, after which the top teams are invited to a final event.

In 2023, it was announced that Google Hash Code would not continue.
