= Romanian Master of Mathematics and Sciences =

Romanian Master of Mathematics
- Founded: 2008
- Region: World
- Current champions: United States – mathematics
- Website: RMMS website

The Romanian Master of Mathematics (RMM) (also known for a period as the Romanian Masters in Mathematics and Sciences) is an annual competition for students at the pre-university level, held in Bucharest, Romania. It is one of the most challenging international high school mathematics competitions. It allows students to demonstrate their mathematical abilities, exchange ideas, and to enhance cross-cultural contacts.

The contestants compete individually in Mathematics. The participating teams (national and local teams) can have up to four official contestants and several nonofficial contestants (plus two coaches: a leader and a deputy leader). The contest follows the same structure as IMO and is usually held at the end of February. The team score is based on the combined scores of three highest official contestants. Each year the winning country brings RMM trophy back to get its name engraved and returns it to the competition the next year.

== History ==
The first RMM was held in 2008 and has been initiated by Prof. Severius Moldoveanu and Prof. Radu Gologan. In 2010, a Physics exam was added, therefore the name changed to Romanian Masters in Mathematics and Sciences (RMMS). At the beginning, the competition structure had been 4 problems in 5 hours, but from 2010 onwards, it was changed to 6 problems over 2 days, with 4.5 hours of exam each day. The 4th edition held in 2011 added exams in Chemistry and Computer Science. The 5th edition in 2012 had exams in Physics and Mathematics only. There was no competition held in 2014.

From the 7th edition in 2015 onwards, the Physics and Informatics competitions have been organised separately under the titles Romanian Master of Physics and Romanian Master of Informatics respectively.

The 15th edition was held from 27 February to 1 March 2024 and won by the team from the United States of America.

=== Teams reaching the top three in mathematics ===
Team	Titles	Runners-up	Third place	Top 3 finishes
United States	7 (2011, 2013, 2016, 2018, 2019, 2023, 2024)	1 (2015)	5 (2009, 2010, 2012, 2020, 2025)	13
Russia	4 (2010, 2015, 2020, 2021*)	4 (2008, 2012, 2013, 2018*)	1 (2011)	9
China	5 (2009, 2012*, 2021*, 2025, 2026)	2 (2010, 2024)	2 (2015, 2017)	7
United Kingdom	1 (2008)	3 (2011*, 2016, 2017)	1 (2013)	5
South Korea	1 (2017)	1 (2019*)	0	2
Romania	1 (2012*)	1 (2023*)	0	2
Hungary	0	3 (2011*, 2018*, 2025)	0	3
Serbia	0	2 (2009, 2019*)	1 (2008)	3
Ukraine	0	1 (2020)	1 (2018)	2
Israel	0	1 (2023*)	1 (2019)	2
Poland	0	0	2 (2016, 2021)	2

* = teams finished equal points

== Organizers ==
The contest is organised at the Tudor Vianu National College of Computer Science in collaboration with the Sector 1 town council. As a host, Tudor Vianu has the right to have its own team entering the contest in each section, thus participating against countries.
