= Topcoder Open =

Computer programming competition hosted by Topcoder

Topcoder Open (TCO)
- 2023 Topcoder Open logo
- Frequency: Annually
- Country: United States
- Years active: 2001–2023
- Inaugurated: November 2–3, 2001
- Most recent: November 17–19, 2022
- Major events: Competitive programming, data science, design, software development
- Organizer: Topcoder
- Website: tco23.topcoder.com

Topcoder Open (TCO) was an annual design, software development, data science and competitive programming championship organized by Topcoder, and hosted in different venues around the United States. In the first two years, 2001 and 2002, the tournament was titled TopCoder Invitational.

In addition to the main championship, from 2001 to 2007, Topcoder organized an annual TopCoder Collegiate Challenge tournament, for college students only. The TopCoder High School competition was held from 2007 to 2010.

From 2015, Topcoder Regional events were held through the year in different countries.

In 2020–2023, in-person Topcoder Open finals were cancelled and replaced by virtual events due to the impact of the COVID-19 pandemic and the subsequent economic slowdown. The 2023 Topcoder Open was the final edition of the contest.

== Competition tracks ==
Competition tracks included in the Topcoder Open tournament changed through its history. Many of them resemble the types of challenges offered to Topcoder Community through the year, but there is no 1:1 match. Here is the alphabetical list of all competition tracks ever present at TCO:

=== Algorithm Competition (SRM) ===
Timeline: 2001 – 2022

Champions: (Belarus) Gennady Korotkevich tourist (2022, 2021, 2020, 2019, 2014); (Russia) Petr Mitrichev Petr (2018, 2015, 2013, 2006); (China) Yuhao Du xudyh (2017); (Japan) Makoto Soejima rng_58 (2016, 2011, 2010); (Russia) Egor Kulikov Egor (2012); (China) Bin Jin crazyb0y (2009); (Poland) Tomasz Czajka tomek (2008, 2004, 2003); (Netherlands) Jan Kuipers Jan_Kuipers (2007); (Poland) Eryk Kopczyński Eryx (2005); (Australia) John Dethridge John Dethridge (2002); (United States) jonmac (2001).

Details:

This was the only track that was present at all main TCO events and at most of the other Topcoder events. It followed the format of regular 1.5 hours Single Round Matches:

- The Coding Phase – 75 mins: All competitors were presented with the same three algorithmic problems of differing complexity. Each problem had its own maximal number of points. Problem descriptions were initially invisible. Competitors had 75 minutes to solve these problems. A competitor could open any problem description in any order; once they opened a problem, the number of points they could get for the correct solution of that problem started decreasing over time. When the competitor submitted the problem solution—code that successfully compiles—they were awarded with the current number of points they could get for that problem. They could re-submit a solution, getting the further decrease number of points, minus extra penalty for the resubmission. During this coding phase, competitors could see the current points awarded to each participant, but they could not see whether the solutions of those participants were correct or incorrect, including whether these scores would hold after The System Testing Phase or if they would be reset.
- The Challenge Phase – 15 mins: Each competitor could see all submissions completed by the other competitors. They could optionally challenge any of them by submitting test cases that would cause other competitor's submission to produce an incorrect result. Submission of a correct challenge test case gave the submitter a 50 points award, but submission of an incorrect test case (i.e. the challenged solution can solve it successfully) would lead to 25 points penalty for the test case submitter.
- The System Testing Phase – In the last phase, system tests were automatically executed for all of the submissions from all competitors. If a submission failed testing, the scores awarded for that submission during The Coding Phase were reset to zero. The final scores after the system testing determined the winner.

=== First to Finish (F2F) ===
Timeline: 2009 – 2014, 2016 – 2022

Champions: (Turkey) Fatih Tas neonray (2022); (Greece) Thomas Kranitsas thomaskranitsas (2021); (Brazil) Victor Roberto Gomes da Cunha cunhavictor (2020); (Nepal) Dilip Kumar Thapa veshu (2019); (Russia) Dmitry Kondakov kondakovdmitry (2018); (Nigeria) Akinwale Ariwodola akinwale (2017, 2014); (China) vvvpig (2016); (India) Pratap Koritala supercharger (2013); (China) Lan Luo hohosky (2012); (China) Yang Li Yeung (2011); (Ukraine) Margaryta Skrypachova Margarita (2010); (China) Ninghai Huang PE (2009).

Details:

This was officially called Mod Dash from 2009 to 2013, and First2Finish from then on. Competitors were provided with a set of small programming tasks, such as bug fixes or enhancements in an existing codebase, and they received scores based on who correctly solved each task first. The exact rules for on-site competition varied from year to year.

=== Information Architecture ===
Timeline: 2015 only.

Champions: (Spain) Silvana Vacchina f0rc0d3r (2015).

Details:

This provided competitors with client requirements for a software product, and they were asked to create a wireframe mockup of the future app or website.

=== Marathon Match (MM) ===
Timeline: 2007 – 2022

Champions: (Poland) Przemysław Dębiak Psyho (2022, 2017, 2016, 2014, 2013, 2011, 2008); (Romania) Catalin-Stefan Tiseanu CatalinT (2021); (Japan) Hironao Tsutsumida iehn (2020); (Belarus) Gennady Korotkevich tourist (2019, 2018); (China) Tiancheng Lou ACRush (2015); (South Korea) Won-Seok Yoo ainu7 (2012); (Japan) Yoichi Iwata wata (2010); (Russia) Andrey Lopatin KOTEHOK (2009); (Poland) Mateusz Zotkiewicz Mojito1 (2007).

Details:

This was officially called Marathon from 2007 to 2022. It followed the format of regular MM competitions: 1–2 weeks for online competitions or 1 day during on-site competitions. Competitors were provided with the same algorithmic or data science problem, which was judged objectively with a live leaderboard which was visible to everyone. Each competitor could submit multiple times with no penalties, with the goal to submit code that scores the maximal possible amount of scores on that problem. During the competition, the leaderboard was generated based on submissions testing against a limited number of test cases, and, after the contest, the final results were determined with testing against a larger test dataset.

=== Quality Assurance Competition (QA) ===
Timeline: 2019 – 2022

Champions: (Sri Lanka) Nuwan Gunarathne codejam (2022, 2021, 2020); (Latvia) Vladimir Timofejev v.t. (2019)

Details:

The QA competition included structured and unstructured testing, structured test case writing, and automated testing.

=== Software Design ===
Timeline: 2004–2014

Champions: (China) Meng Wang albertwang (2014, 2013); (Canada) Michael Paweska argolite (2012, 2010); (China) WuJian Ye BLE (2011); (Ukraine) Olexiy Sadovnikov saarixx (2009); (United States) Tim Roberts Pops (2008, 2006); (United States) Sergey Kalinchenko kyky (2007); (Russia) Nikolay Archak nicka81 (2005); (Romania) Adrian Carcu adic (2004).

Details:

This was officially called Component Design from 2004 to 2009, and Design from 2010 to 2014. Competitors were asked to take client requirements for a software component or product as input and produce development documentation or technical specifications. Solutions were evaluated by a panel of judges according to objective scorecards.

=== Software Development ===
Timeline: 2004 – 2022

Champions: (China) xxcxy (2022); (China) Jiang Liwu jiangliwu (2021, 2019); (Spain) Dr. Sergey Pogodin birdofpreyru (2020, 2017); (Vietnam) Ngoc Pham ngoctay (2018); (Poland) Łukasz Sentkiewicz Sky_ (2016, 2015, 2014); (China) Zhijie Liu morehappiness (2013); (China) Yang Li Yeung (2012, 2010); (Philippines) Franklin Guevarra j3_guile (2011); (China) GuanZhuo Jin Standlove (2009 – Architecture, 2004); (Argentina) Pablo Wolfus pulky (2009 – Assembly); (China) Yanbo Wu assistant (2009 – Component Development); (Canada) Piotr Paweska AleaActaEst (2009 – Specification); (Brazil) Romano Silva romanoTC (2008); (China) Feng He hefeng (2007); (Indonesia) Sindunata Sudarmagi sindu (2006); (China) Qi Liu visualage (2005).

Details:

This was officially called Component Development from 2004 to 2009, and Development from 2010 to 2022. The actual rules differed from year to year, but, typically, competitors were presented with technical specifications for development of a software component, application, or tool, or they were presented with more open, hackathon-style requirements, which they must implement in the best possible way in 4 hours. Submitted solutions were evaluated by a panel of judges according to objective scorecards.

=== UI Design ===
Timeline: 2007 – 2022

Champions: (Thailand) Teeraporn Sriponpak iamtong (2022, 2021, 2020, 2018, 2012); (India) L. O. I. (2019); (Indonesia) Panji Kharisma kharm (2017); (Indonesia) Junius Albertho abedavera (2016, 2015, 2013, 2011); (Indonesia) Faridah Amalia Mandaga fairy_ley (2014); (Indonesia) Tri Joko Rubiyanto djackmania (2010); (Australia) Dale Napier djnapier (2009); (Philippines) Nino Rey Ronda oninkxronda (2008); (China) Yiming Liao yiming (2007).

Details:

The event was officially called Studio from 2007 to 2014, and UI Design from 2015 onwards. Competitors, provided with client requirements, were asked to create the best user interface design for a software product.

=== UI Prototype ===
Timeline: 2015–2018

Champions: (Sri Lanka) Mouly Gunarathne moulyg (2018, 2017, 2016); (Sri Lanka) Dileepa Balasuriya dileepa (2015).

Details:

Competitors were provided with design specifications for a website or web-application, and they were required to create a working prototype of the frontend within approximately 4 hours. The resulting submissions were judged against objective scorecards.

== List of Topcoder Open events ==
These are the main Topcoder Open events where champions were determined.

The list of Topcoder Open events, and their winners
Date	Event	Venue	Competition Tracks, (Note: The following abbreviations are used in the table "The list of Topcoder Open and Regional events": Dev = Software Development (Code); Dg = UI Design (also called as Studio Design); DS = Data Science; F2F = First to Finish (also called Mod Dash); IA = Information Architecture (Wireframes); MM = Marathon Match; Pr = UI Prototype; QA = Quality Assurance Competition; SDg = Software Design (also called Component Design, and just Design); SRM = Algorithm.) and Their Champions (Note: Topcoder member nicknames are given in italic)
Nov 15–18, 2022	TCO22 (online)	Online	Dev ( (China) xxcxy), Dg ( (Thailand) Teeraporn Sriponpak iamtong), F2F ( (Turkey) Fatih Tas neonray), MM ( (Poland) Przemysław Dębiak Psyho), QA ( (Sri Lanka) Nuwan Gunarathne codejam), SRM ( (Belarus) Gennady Korotkevich tourist)
Nov 13–20, 2021	TCO21 (online)	Online	Dev ( (China) Jiang Liwu jiangliwu), Dg ( (Thailand) Teeraporn Sriponpak iamtong), F2F ( (Greece) Thomas Kranitsas thomaskranitsas), MM ( (Romania) Catalin-Stefan Tiseanu CatalinT), QA ( (Sri Lanka) Nuwan Gunarathne codejam), SRM ( (Belarus) Gennady Korotkevich tourist)
Nov 13–22, 2020	TCO20 (online (Note: Originally planned to be held in Seattle, WA, USA; held online due to COVID-19 pandemic.))	Online, at hopin.to platform.	Dev ( (Spain) Sergey Pogodin birdofpreyru), Dg ( (Thailand) Teeraporn Sriponpak iamtong), F2F ( (Brazil) Victor Roberto Gomes da Cunha cunhavictor), MM ( (Japan) Hironao Tsutsumida iehn), QA ( (Sri Lanka) Nuwan Gunarathne codejam), SRM ( (Belarus) Gennady Korotkevich tourist)
Nov 13–16, 2019	TCO19 (Houston, TX, USA)	InterContinental Houston – Medical Center	Dev ( (China) Jiang Liwu jiangliwu), Dg ( (India) L. O. I.), F2F ( (Nepal) Dilip Kumar Thapa veshu), MM ( (Belarus) Gennady Korotkevich tourist), QA ( (Latvia) Vladimir Timofejev v.t.), SRM ( (Belarus) Gennady Korotkevich tourist)
Nov 13–16, 2018	TCO18 (Dallas, TX, USA)	Southfork Ranch	Dev ( (Vietnam) Ngoc Pham ngoctay), Dg ( (Thailand) Teeraporn Sriponpak iamtong), F2F ( (Russia) Dmitry Kondakov kondakovdmitry), MM ( (Belarus) Gennady Korotkevich tourist), Pr ( (Sri Lanka) Mouly Gunarathne moulyg), SRM ( (Russia) Petr Mitrichev Petr)
Oct 21–24, 2017	TCO17 (Buffalo, NY, USA)	Buffalo Niagara Medical Campus	Dev ( (Spain) Sergey Pogodin birdofpreyru), Dg ( (Indonesia) Panji Kharisma kharm), F2F ( (Nigeria) Akinwale Ariwodola akinwale), MM ( (Poland) Przemysław Dębiak Psyho), Pr ( (Sri Lanka) Mouly Gunarathne moulyg), SRM ( (China) Yuhao Du xudyh)
Nov 18–21, 2016	TCO16 (Washington DC, USA)	Booz Allen Hamilton Innovation Center	Dev ( (Poland) Łukasz Sentkiewicz Sky_), Dg ( (Indonesia) Junius Albertho abedavera), F2F ( (China) vvvpig), MM ( (Poland) Przemysław Dębiak Psyho), Pr ( (Sri Lanka) Mouly Gunarathne moulyg), SRM ( (Japan) Makoto Soejima rng_58)
Nov 8–10, 2015	TCO15 (Indianapolis, IN, USA) (Note: In 2015, on-site finals for UI Design and UI Prototype competitions were held at TCO15 Yogyakarta event; and other on-site finals: Competitive Programming (SMR), Information Architecture, Marathon Match, Software Development were held at TCO15 Indianapolis event.)	Omni Severin Hotel	Dev ( (Poland) Łukasz Sentkiewicz Sky_), IA ( (Spain) Silvana Vacchina f0rc0d3r), MM ( (China) TianCheng Lou ACRush), SRM ( (Russia) Petr Mitrichev Petr)
Sep 21–22, 2015	TCO15 – Yogyakarta (Indonesia)	Eastparc Hotel	Dg ( (Indonesia) Junius Albertho abedavera), Pr ( (Sri Lanka) Dileepa Balasuriya dileepa)
Nov 16–19, 2014	TCO14 – San Francisco (CA, USA)	Pier 48	Dev ( (Poland) Łukasz Sentkiewicz Sky_), Dg ( (Indonesia) Faridah Amalia Mandaga fairy_ley), F2F ( (Nigeria) Akinwale Ariwodola akinwale), MM ( (Poland) Przemysław Dębiak Psyho), SDg ( (China) Meng Wang albertwang), SRM ( (Belarus) Gennady Korotkevich tourist)
Nov 10–14, 2013	TCO13 (Washington DC, USA)	Capital Hilton Hotel	Dev ( (China) Zhijie Liu morehappiness), Dg ( (Indonesia) Junius Albertho abedavera), F2F ( (India) Pratap Koritala supercharger), MM ( (Poland) Przemysław Dębiak Psyho), SDg ( (China) Meng Wang albertwang), SRM ( (Russia) Petr Mitrichev Petr)
Sep 30 – October 4, 2012	TCO12 (Orlando, FL, USA)	Caribe Royale Hotel	Dev ( (China) Yang Li Yeung), Dg ( (Thailand) Teeraporn Sriponpak iamtong), F2F ( (China) Kan Luo hohosky), MM ( (South Korea) Won-Seok Yoo ainu7), SDg ( (Canada) Michael Paweska argolite), SRM ( (Russia) Egor Egor)
Sep 25–28, 2011	TCO11 (Hollywood, FL, USA)	Westin Diplomat Resort & Spa	Dev ( (Philippines) Franklin Guevarra j3_guile), Dg ( (Indonesia) Junius Albertho abedavera), F2F ( (China) Yang Lee Yeung), MM ( (Poland) Przemysław Dębiak Psyho), SDg ( (China) WuJian Ye BLE), SRM ( (Japan) Makoto Soejima rng_58)
Oct 11–14, 2010	TCO10 (Las Vegas, NV, USA)	The Mirage	Dev ( (China) Yang Li Yeung), Dg ( (Indonesia) Tri Joko Rubiyanto djackmania), F2F ( (Ukraine) Margaryta Skrypachova Margarita), MM ( (Japan) Yoichi Iwata wata), SDg ( (Canada) Michael Paweska argolite), SRM ( (Japan) Makoto Soejima rng_58)
Jun 1–4, 2009	TCO09 (Las Vegas, NV, USA)	The Mirage	Dev (Note: Software development competition that year was online-only, and it was divided into Architecture, Assembly, Component Design, Component Development, and Specification sub-tracks.) (Architecture: (China) GuanZhuo Jin Standlove; Assembly: (Argentina) Pablo Wolfus pulky; Component Development: (China) Yanbo Wu assistant; Specification: (Canada) Piotr Paweska AleaActaEst), Dg ( (Australia) Dale Napier djnapier), F2F ( (China) Ninghai Huang PE), MM ( (Russia) Andrey Lopatin KOTEHOK), SDg ( (Ukraine) Olexiy Sadovnikov saarixx), SRM ( (China) Bin Jin crazyb0y)
May 11–15, 2008	TCO08 (Las Vegas, NV, USA)	The Mirage	Dev ( (Brazil) Romano Silva romanoTC), Dg ( (Philippines) Nino Rey Ronda oninkxronda), MM ( (Poland) Przemysław Dębiak Psyho), SDg ( (United States) Tim Roberts Pops), SRM ( (Poland) Tomasz Czajka tomek)
Jun 26–29, 2007	TCO07 (Las Vegas, NV, USA) (Note: Officially titled 2007 TopCoder Open Sponsored by AOL)	The Mirage	Dev ( (China) Feng He hefeng), Dg ( (China) Yiming Liao yiming), MM ( (Poland) Mateusz Zotkiewicz Mojito1), SDg ( (United States) Sergey Kalinchenko kyky), SRM ( (Netherlands) Jan Kuipers Jan_Kuipers)
May 3–5, 2006	TCO06 (Las Vegas, NV, USA) (Note: Officially titled 2005 TopCoder Open Sponsored by AMD)	Aladdin Resort and Casino	Dev ( (Indonesia) Sindunata Sudarmagi sindu), SDg ( (United States) Tim Roberts Pops), SRM ( (Russia) Petr Mitrichev Petr)
Oct 12–14, 2005	TCO05 (Santa Clara, CA, USA) (Note: Officially titled 2005 TopCoder Open Sponsored by Sun Microsystems)	Santa Clara Marriot	Dev ( (China) Qi Liu visualage), SDg ( (Russia) Nikolay Archak nicka81), SRM ( (Poland) Eryk Kopczyński Eryx)
Nov 11–12, 2004	TCO04 (Santa Clara, CA, USA) (Note: Officially titled 2004 TopCoder Open Sponsored by Microsoft)	Santa Clara Marriot	Dev ( (China) GuanZhuo Jin Standlove), SDg ( (Romania) Adrian Carcu adic), SRM ( (Poland) Tomasz Czajka tomek)
Dec 4–5, 2003	TCO03 (Uncasville, CT, USA) (Note: Officially titled 2003 TopCoder Open Sponsored by Intel)	Mohegan Sun Casino	SRM ( (Poland) Tomasz Czajka tomek)
Nov 22–23, 2002	TCI02 (Uncasville, CT, USA) (Note: Officially titled 2002 TopCoder Invitational)	Mohegan Sun Casino	SRM ( (Australia) John Dethridge John Dethridge)
Nov 2–3, 2001	TCI01 (Mashantucket, CT, USA) (Note: Officially titled 2001 TopCoder Invitational)	Foxwoods Resort Casino	SRM ( (United States) jonmac)

== Topcoder Open victories by countries represented by champions ==
Topcoder Open Victories by Countries Represented by Champions (Note: Updated up to TCO22, inclusive)
Country	Total	Competition Tracks								
Country	Total	Dev	Dg	F2F	IA	MM	Pr	QA	SDg	SRM
Argentina	1	1								
Australia	2		1							1
Belarus	7					2				5
Brazil	2	1		1						
Canada	3	1							2	
China	22	11	1	4		1			3	2
Greece	1			1						
India	2		1	1						
Indonesia	8	1	7							
Japan	5					2				3
Latvia	1							1		
Nepal	1			1						
Netherlands	1									1
Nigeria	2			2						
Philippines	2	1	1							
Poland	15	3				8				4
Romania	2					1			1	
Russia	8			1		1			1	5
South Korea	1					1				
Spain	3	2			1					
Sri Lanka	7						4	3		
Thailand	5		5							
Turkey	1			1						
Ukraine	2			1					1	
Vietnam	1	1								
(United States) USA	4								3	1
