= International Collegiate Programming Contest =

Worldwide competitive programming contest for university students

The International Collegiate Programming Contest (ICPC) is an annual multi-tiered competitive programming competition among the universities of the world. Directed by ICPC Executive Director and Baylor Professor William B. Poucher, the ICPC operates autonomous regional contests covering six continents culminating in a global World Finals every year. In 2018, ICPC participation included 52,709 students from 3,233 universities in 110 countries.

The ICPC operates under the auspices of the ICPC Foundation and operates under agreements with host universities and non-profits, all in accordance with the ICPC Policies and Procedures. From 1977 until 2017 ICPC was held under the auspices of ACM and was referred to as ACM-ICPC.

== History ==
The ICPC traces its roots to a competition held at Texas A&M University in 1970 hosted by the Alpha chapter of the Upsilon Pi Epsilon Computer Science Honor Society (UPE). This initial programming competition was titled First Annual Texas Collegiate Programming Championship and each university was represented by a team of up to five members. The computer used was a IBM System/360 model 65 which was one of the first machines with a DAT (Dynamic Address Translator aka "paging") system for accessing memory. Teams that participated included Texas A&M, Texas Tech, University of Houston, and five or six other Texas University / Colleges. There were three problems that had to be completed and the cumulative time from "start" to "successful completion" determined first-, second-, and third-place winners. The programming language used was Fortran. The programs were written on coding sheets, keypunched on Hollerith cards, and submitted for execution. The University of Houston team won the competition completing all three problems successfully with time. The second- and third-place teams did not successfully complete all three problems. The contest evolved into its present form as a multi-tier competition in 1977, with the first finals held in conjunction with the ACM Computer Science Conference.

From 1977 to 1989, the contest included mainly teams of four from universities throughout the United States and Canada. ICPC Headquarters was hosted by Baylor University from 1989 until 2022, with regional contests established within the world's university community, the ICPC has grown into a worldwide competition. To increase access to the World Finals, teams were reduced to three students within their first five academic years.

From 1997 to 2017, International Business Machines Corporation (IBM) was the sponsor of ICPC. During that time contest participation has grown by more than 2000%. In 1997, 840 teams from 560 universities participated. In 2017, 46,381 students from 2,948 universities in 103 countries on six continents participated in regional competitions. Organized as a highly localized extra-curricular university mind sport and operating as a globally-coordinated unincorporated association operating under agreements with host universities and non-profits, the ICPC is open to qualified teams from every university in the world.

UPE has provided continuous support since 1970 and honored World Finalists since the first Finals in 1976. The ICPC is indebted to ACM member contributions and ACM assistance from 1976 to 2018. Baylor University served since 1985, hosting ICPC Headquarters from 1989 until 2022. The ICPC operates under the auspices of the ICPC Foundation which provides the ICPC Global Headquarters to service a globally-coordinated community whose events operate under agreements with host universities and non-profits to insure that participation in ICPC is open to qualified teams from every university in the world. See ICPC Policies and Procedures.

The ICPC World Finals (The Annual World Finals of the International Collegiate Programming Contest) is the final round of competition. Over its history it has become a 4-day event held in the finest venues worldwide with 140 teams competing in the 2018 World Finals. Recent World Champion teams have been recognized by their country's head of state. In recent years, media impressions have hovered at the one billion mark.

From 2000 to 2022, excluding 2021, only teams from Russia, China, and Poland have won the ICPC world finals. Participation in North America is much smaller than in the rest of the world, which is partially attributed to the perceived low payoff of participating.

== Contest rules ==
ICPC contests are team competitions. Current rules stipulate that each team consist of three students. Participants must be university students, who have had less than five years of university education before the contest. Students who have previously competed in two World Finals or five regional competitions are ineligible to compete again.

During each contest, the teams of three are given 5 hours to solve between eight and fifteen programming problems (with eight typical for regionals and twelve for finals). They must submit solutions as programs in C, C++, Java, Ada, Python or Kotlin (although it is not guaranteed every problem is solvable in any certain language, the ICPC website states that "the judges will have solved all problems in Java and C++" for both regional and world finals competitions). Programs are then run on test data. If a program fails to give a correct answer, the team is notified and can submit another program.

The winner is the team which correctly solves the most problems. If necessary to rank teams for medals or prizes among tying teams, the placement of teams is determined by the sum of the elapsed times at each point that they submitted correct solutions plus 20 minutes for each rejected submission of a problem ultimately solved. There is no time consumed for a problem that is not solved.

Compared to other programming contests (for example, International Olympiad in Informatics), the ICPC is characterized by a large number of problems (eight or more problems in just 5 hours). Another feature is that each team can use only one computer, although teams have three students. This makes the time pressure even greater. Good teamwork and ability to withstand pressure is needed to win.

== 2004–2025 finals ==
=== 2004 World Finals ===
The 2004 ACM-ICPC World Finals were hosted at the Obecni Dum, Prague, by Czech Technical University in Prague. 3,150 teams representing 1,411 universities from 75 countries competed in elimination rounds, with 73 of those teams proceeding to the world finals. St. Petersburg Institute of Fine Mechanics and Optics from Russia won, solving 7 of 10 problems. Gold medalists were St. Petersburg Institute of Fine Mechanics and Optics, KTH Royal Institute of Technology (Sweden), Belarusian State University, and Perm State University (Russia).

=== 2005 World Finals ===
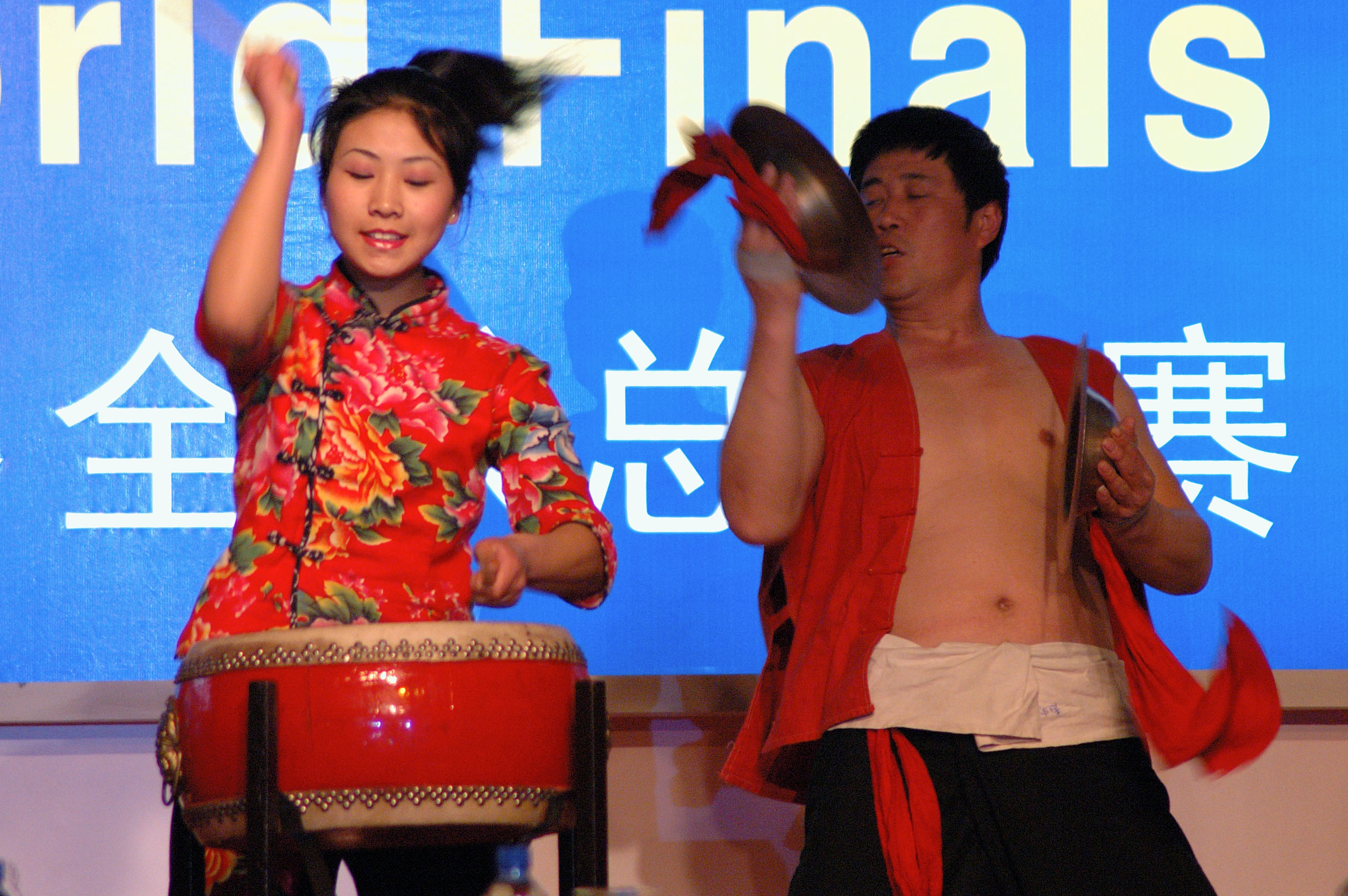
Opening Ceremony in 2005

The 2005 world finals were held at Pudong Shangri-La Hotel in Shanghai on April 6, 2005, hosted by Shanghai Jiao Tong University. 4,109 teams representing 1,582 universities from 71 countries competed in elimination rounds, with 78 of those teams proceeding to the world finals. Shanghai Jiao Tong University won its second world title, with 8 of 10 problems solved. Gold medal winners were Shanghai Jiao Tong University, Moscow State University (Russia), St. Petersburg Institute of Fine Mechanics and Optics (Russia), and University of Waterloo (Canada).

=== 2006 World Finals ===
The 2006 ACM-ICPC World Finals were held in San Antonio, Texas, and hosted by Baylor University. 5,606 teams representing 1,733 universities from 84 countries competed in elimination rounds, with 83 of those teams proceeding to the world finals. Saratov State University from Russia won, solving 6 of 10 problems. Gold medal winners were Saratov, Jagiellonian University (Poland), Altai State Technical University (Russia), University of Twente (The Netherlands).

=== 2007 World Finals ===
The 2007 ACM-ICPC World Finals were held at the Tokyo Bay Hilton, in Tokyo, Japan, March 12–16, 2007. The World Finals was hosted by the ACM Japan Chapter and the IBM Tokyo Research Lab. Some 6,099 teams competed on six continents at the regional level. Eighty-eight teams advanced to the World Finals. Warsaw University won its second world championship, solving 8 of 10 problems. Gold Medal Winners were Warsaw University, Tsinghua University (China), St. Petersburg Institute of Fine Mechanics and Optics (Russia), and the Massachusetts Institute of Technology (United States). Silver Medal Winners include Shanghai Jiao Tong University (China) and 3 other universities.

=== 2008 World Finals ===
The 2008 ACM-ICPC World Finals were held at the Fairmont Banff Springs Hotel, in Banff, Alberta, Canada, April 6–10, 2008. The World Finals was hosted by the University of Alberta. There were 100 teams in the World finals, out of 6700 total teams competing in the earlier rounds. The St. Petersburg Institute of Fine Mechanics and Optics won their second world championship. Massachusetts Institute of Technology, Izhevsk State Technical University, and Lviv National University also received gold medals.

=== 2009 World Finals ===
The 2009 ACM-ICPC World Finals were held in Stockholm, Sweden, April 18–22, at the campus of the hosting institution, KTH Royal Institute of Technology, as well as at the Grand Hotel, the Radisson Strand, and the Diplomat Hotel. There were 100 teams from over 200 regional sites competing for the World Championship. The St. Petersburg Institute of Fine Mechanics and Optics defended their title, winning their third world championship. Tsinghua University, St. Petersburg State University, and Saratov State University also received gold medals. The 2009 World Finals pioneered live video broadcasting of the entire contest, featuring elements such as expert commentary, live feeds of teams and their computer screens and interviews with judges, coaches and dignitaries. The event was broadcast online, as well as by Swedish television channel Axess TV.

=== 2010 World Finals ===
The 2010 ACM-ICPC World Finals were held in Harbin, China. The host is Harbin Engineering University. Shanghai Jiao Tong University won the world championship. Moscow State University, National Taiwan University, and Taras Shevchenko Kyiv National University also received gold medals.

=== 2011 World Finals ===
The 2011 ACM-ICPC World Finals were held in Orlando, Florida and hosted by main sponsor IBM. The contest was initially scheduled to be held in Sharm el-Sheikh, Egypt in February, but was moved due to the political instability associated with the Arab Spring. Zhejiang University took first place with the University of Michigan at Ann Arbor, Tsinghua University, and Saint Petersburg State University taking 2nd, 3rd, and 4th respectively each receiving gold medals. China (2G) United States (1G) Russia (1G, 2S, 2B) Germany (1S) Ukraine (1S) Poland (1B) Canada (1B)

=== 2012 World Finals ===
The 2012 World Finals were held in Warsaw, Poland. They were inaugurated on 15 May and hosted by University of Warsaw. St. Petersburg Institute of Fine Mechanics and Optics won their fourth world championship, the most by any University at the time. University of Warsaw, Moscow Institute of Physics and Technology, and Shanghai Jiao Tong University took 2nd, 3rd, and 4th place respectively each receiving gold medals. Russia (2G, 1B) China (1G,1S) Poland (1G) United States (1S) Hong Kong (1S) Belarus (1S, 1B) Canada (1B) Japan (1B)

=== 2013 World Finals ===
The 2013 World Finals were held in Saint Petersburg, Russia. They were inaugurated on 3 July and were hosted by NRU ITMO.

2013 top thirteen teams that received medals are:

Japan (1G) Russia (1G, 1S, 2B) China (1G, 1B) Taiwan (1G) Poland (1S, 1B) Ukraine (1S) Belarus (1S) United States (1B)

- Saint Petersburg State University of Information Technologies, Mechanics and Optics (GOLD, WORLD CHAMPION),
- Shanghai Jiao Tong University (GOLD, 2nd Place),
- The University of Tokyo (GOLD, 3rd Place),
- National Taiwan University (GOLD, 4th Place),
- St. Petersburg State University (SILVER, 5th Place),
- University of Warsaw (SILVER, 6th Place),
- Taras Shevchenko National University of Kyiv (SILVER, 7th Place),
- Belarusian State University (SILVER, 8th Place),
- Jagiellonian University in Krakow (BRONZE, 9th Place),
- Moscow State University (BRONZE, 10th Place),
- Carnegie Mellon University (BRONZE, 11th Place),
- Tsinghua University (BRONZE, 12th Place),
- Perm State University (BRONZE, 13th Place).

=== 2014 World Finals ===
The 2014 World Finals were held in Ekaterinburg, Russia on June 21–25, hosted by Ural Federal University. The final competition was held on June 25. 122 teams participated in the competition and St. Petersburg State University became the world champion.

Following teams were awarded medals in ICPC 2014:

Russia (2G, 2B) China (1G, 1S, 1B) Taiwan (1G) Japan (1S) Poland (1S) Croatia (1S) Slovakia (1B)

Gold

- St. Petersburg State University
- Moscow State University
- Peking University
- National Taiwan University

Silver

- University of Warsaw
- Shanghai Jiao Tong University
- The University of Tokyo
- University of Zagreb

Bronze

- St. Petersburg National Research University of IT, Mechanics and Optics
- National Research University Higher School of Economics
- Tsinghua University
- Comenius University

=== 2015 World Finals ===
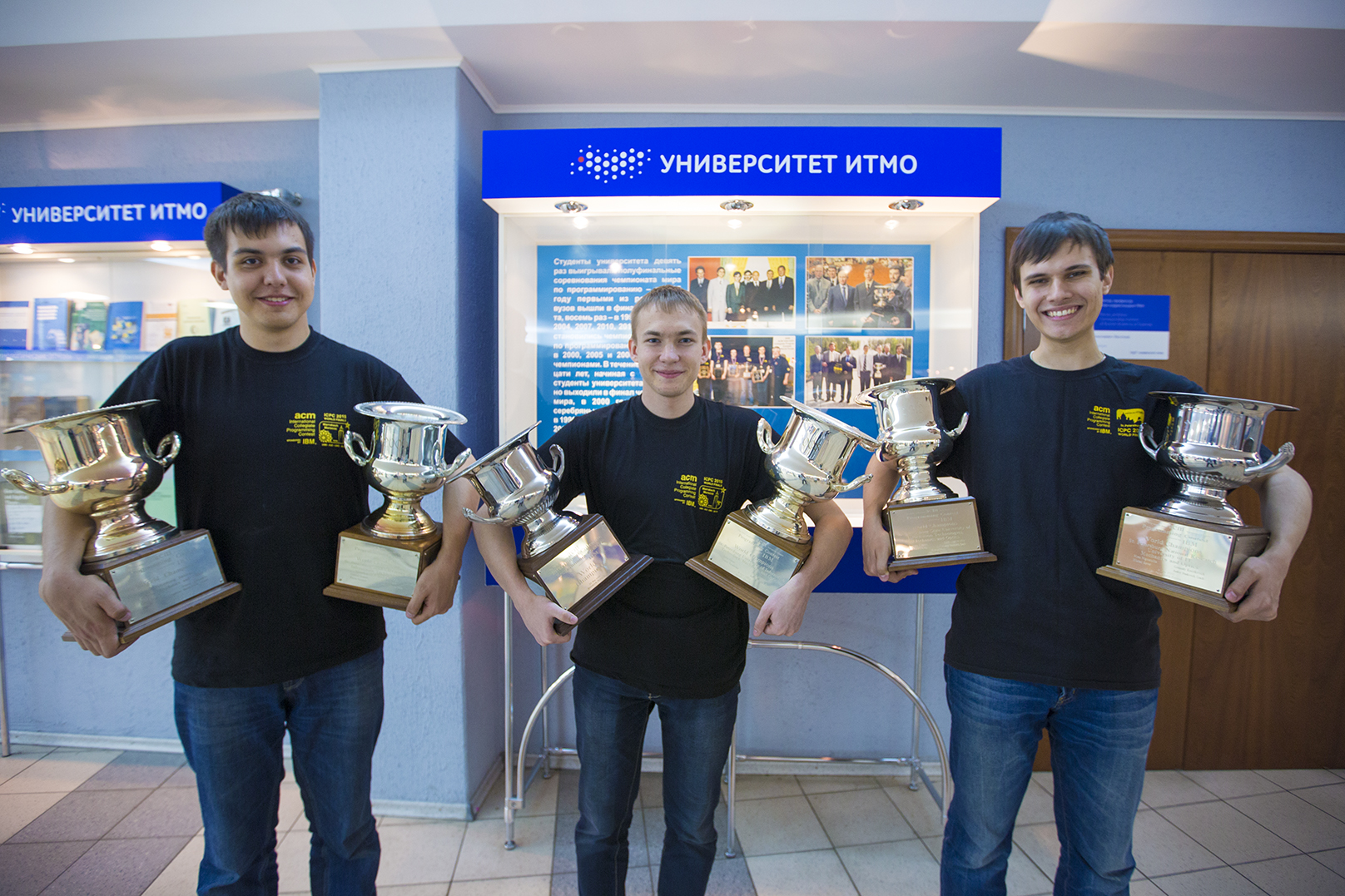
ITMO team 2015

The 2015 World Finals were held in Marrakesh (Morocco) during May 16–21, hosted by Mohammed the Fifth University, Al Akhawayn University and Mundiapolis University. The final competition took place on May 20. 128 teams competed to be World Champion. Saint Petersburg ITMO emerged as the winner, having solved all problems (13) for the first time ever. Other medalists included teams from Russia (2G), China (1G, 1B, 1S), Japan (1G), the United States (1B, 1S), Croatia (1S), Czech Republic (1S), Korea (1B), and Poland (1B).

Gold

- ITMO University
- Moscow State University
- University of Tokyo
- Tsinghua University

Silver

- Peking University
- University of California, Berkeley
- University of Zagreb
- Charles University

Bronze

- Shanghai Jiao Tong University
- Massachusetts Institute of Technology
- Korea University
- University of Warsaw

=== 2016 World Finals ===
The 2016 World Finals were held in Phuket (Thailand) during May 16–21. The final competition was on May 19. 128 teams competed to be World Champion. The winners were Saint Petersburg State University, solving 11 out of 13 problems. The first runners-up were Shanghai Jiao Tong University, also solving 11 problems, but 7 minutes behind the winning team.

Gold

- Saint Petersburg State University
- Shanghai Jiao Tong University
- Harvard University
- Moscow Institute of Physics and Technology

Silver

- University of Warsaw
- Massachusetts Institute of Technology
- St. Petersburg ITMO University
- Ural Federal University

Bronze

- University of Warsaw
- N. I. Lobachevsky State University of Nizhny Novgorod
- Lviv National University
- Fudan University

=== 2017 World Finals ===
The 2017 World Finals were held in Rapid City, South Dakota (United States) during May 20–25, hosted by Excellence in Computer Programming. Due to visa issue, several teams were unable to present onsite, in which the affected schools are allowed direct qualifications for ICPC 2018 besides the usual qualification spots.

The winner was ITMO University. Teams of the following countries were awarded medals in ICPC 2017: Russia (2 Gold, 1 Silver, 1 Bronze), Poland (1 Gold), South Korea (1 Gold, 1 Bronze), China (3 Silver), Sweden (1 Bronze), Japan (1 Bronze).

Gold

- ITMO University
- University of Warsaw
- Seoul National University
- Saint Petersburg State University

Silver

- Moscow Institute of Physics and Technology
- Tsinghua University
- Peking University
- Fudan University

Bronze

- KAIST
- Ural Federal University
- KTH Royal Institute of Technology
- University of Tokyo

=== 2018 World Finals ===
The 2018 World Finals were held in Beijing (China), during April 15–20, hosted by Peking University.

	Rank in Final	Country	Institution	First to Solve Problem	Number of solved problems
01	1	Russia	Moscow State University	Panda Preserve & Single Cut of Failure	9
02	2	Russia	Moscow Institute of Physics and Technology	Getting a Jump on Crime	8
03	3	China	Peking University	Gem Island	8
04	4	Japan	The University of Tokyo		8
05	5	South Korea	Seoul National University	Comma Sprinkler	7
06	6	Australia	University of New South Wales	Wireless is the New Fiber	7
07	7	China	Tsinghua University		7
08	8	China	Shanghai Jiao Tong University		7
09	9	Russia	ITMO University	Go with the Flow	7
10	10	United States	University of Central Florida		7
11	11	United States	Massachusetts Institute of Technology		7
12	12	Lithuania	Vilnius University	Catch the Plane	7
13	13	Russia	Ural Federal University		7

In 2018 World Final, problems "Conquer the World" and "Uncrossed Knight's Tour" were not solved.

=== 2019 World Finals ===
The 2019 World Finals were held in Porto (Portugal) from March 31 to April 5, 2019, hosted by the University of Porto and the City of Porto.

	Rank in Final	Country	Institution	Number of solved problems
01	1	Russia	Moscow State University	10
02	2	United States	Massachusetts Institute of Technology	9
03	3	Japan	University of Tokyo	9
04	4	Poland	University of Warsaw	8
05	5	Taiwan	National Taiwan University	8
06	6	Poland	University of Wroclaw	8
07	7	South Korea	Seoul National University	7
08	8	North Korea	KimChaek University of Technology	7
09	9	Iran	Sharif University of Technology	7
10	10	Russia	Moscow Institute of Physics & Technology	7
11	11	Russia	National Research University Higher School of Economics	7
12	12	China	The Chinese University of Hong Kong	7

=== World Finals Moscow (2020) ===
Because of the COVID-19 pandemic, the 2020 World Finals were postponed. The finals took place in Moscow (Russia) from October 1 to October 5, 2021, hosted by Moscow Institute of Physics and Technology. To avoid confusion with dates, in all official materials it was called "World Finals Moscow" instead of 2020 or 2021.

"ICPC World Finals Moscow final standings". ICPC World finals. Archived from the original on 2021-10-05.

	Rank in Final	Country	Institution	First to Solve Problem	Number of solved problems
01	1	Russia	State University of Nizhny Novgorod	B (The Cost of Speed Limits); H (QC QC)	12
02	2	South Korea	Seoul National University	F (Ley Lines)	11
03	3	Russia	ITMO University	I (Quests)	11
04	4	Russia	Moscow Institute of Physics and Technology		11
05	5	Poland	University of Wroclaw	G (Opportunity Cost)	11
06	6	United Kingdom	University of Cambridge	A (Cardiology)	11
07	7	Belarus	Belarusian State University		11
08	8	Romania	University of Bucharest	D (Gene Folding); O (Which Planet is This?!)	10
09	9	United States	Massachusetts Institute of Technology	E (Landscape Generator); J (’S No Problem)	10
10	10	Ukraine	Kharkiv National University of Radio Electronics		10
11	11	United States	University of Illinois at Urbana-Champaign		10
12	12	Russia	Higher School of Economics		9

In 2020–2021 World Final, problems K (Space Walls) and L (Sweep Stakes) were not solved.

=== World Finals Dhaka (2021) ===
The 45-th World Finals initially scheduled for 2021, was held in Dhaka (Bangladesh) from November 6 to November 11, 2022, because of schedule changes due to COVID-19 pandemic, hosted by the University of Asia Pacific. To avoid confusion about dates, it was called World Finals Dhaka in all official materials.

	Rank in Final	Country	Institution	Number of solved problems
01	1	United States	Massachusetts Institute of Technology	11
02	2	China	Peking University	10
03	3	Japan	The University of Tokyo	9
04	4	South Korea	Seoul National University	9
05	5	Switzerland	ETH Zürich	9
06	6	France	École Normale Supérieure de Paris	9
07	7	United States	Carnegie Mellon University	9
08	8	Poland	University of Warsaw	8
09	9	Russia	National Research University Higher School of Economics	8
10	10	Russia	St. Petersburg State University	8
11	11	United Kingdom	University of Oxford	8
12	12	Vietnam	University of Engineering and Technology - VNU	8

=== World Finals Luxor (2022 & 2023) ===
To synchronize with the schedule after all rescheduling because of COVID-19 pandemic both 46-th and 47-th world finals were scheduled to take place in the same time in November 2023 in Sharm El Sheikh. Because of Gaza war and related safety concerns, it was rescheduled once again and finally happened in Luxor in April from 14th to 19 April 2024. To avoid confusion about dates, the event was referred to as World Finals Luxor (World Finals Sharm before rescheduling), with two competitions as 46th and 47th separately, if needed, in all official materials.

Two competitions were held in parallel, with intersecting problem sets. In 47-th finals, due to very close results (less than 40 penalty minutes difference between 12 and 16 place), additional bronze medals were awarded at the next finals in Astana.

46th Finals medalists
	Rank in Final	Country	Institution	Number of solved problems
01	1	China	Peking University	10
02	2	USA	Massachusetts Institute of Technology	9
03	3	Russia	National Research University Higher School of Economics	9
04	4	UK	University of Oxford	9
05	5	Russia	Moscow Institute of Physics and Technology	9
06	6	South Korea	Seoul National University	9
07	7	Ukraine	Taras Shevchenko National University of Kyiv	9
08	8	USA	University of Wisconsin-Madison	8
09	9	Japan	The University of Tokyo	8
10	10	China	Tsinghua University	8
11	11	China	Nanjing University of Posts and Telecommunications	8
12	12	Taiwan	National Taiwan University	8

47th Finals medalists
	Rank in Final	Country	Institution	Number of solved problems	Penalty time
01	1	Russia	National Research University Higher School of Economics	9	995
02	2	China	Peking University	9	1068
03	3	Russia	Moscow Institute of Physics and Technology	9	1143
04	4	Spain	Harbour.Space University	9	1304
05	5	China	Tsinghua University	9	1524
06	6	China	Nanjing University	8	1013
07	7	South Korea	Seoul National University	8	1102
08	8	Canada	University of Waterloo	8	1120
09	9	Japan	The University of Tokyo	8	1121
10	10	Japan	Tokyo Institute of Technology	8	1424
11	11	US	Brigham Young University	7	842
12	12	Poland	University of Warsaw	7	940
13	13	Argentina	Universidad de Buenos Aires	7	955
14	14	UK	University of Cambridge	7	962
15	15	Taiwan	National Taiwan University	7	962
16	16	China	Xi'an Jiaotong University	7	980

=== World Finals Astana (2024) ===
The 48th World Finals was held on 15–20 September 2024 in Astana, Kazakhstan hosted by The Kazakhstan Competitive Programming Federation.

	Rank in Final	Country	Institution	Number of solved problems	Penalty time
01	1	China	Peking University	9	935
02	2	Russia	Moscow Institute of Physics and Technology	9	1212
03	3	China	Tsinghua University	9	1218
04	4	Japan	Tokyo Institute of Technology	9	1322
05	5	South Korea	KAIST	8	868
06	6	Singapore	National University of Singapore	8	934
07	7	China	Beijing Jiaotong University	8	960
08	8	Japan	The University of Tokyo	8	1031
09	9	South Korea	Seoul National University	8	1112
10	10	China	Zhejiang University	8	1166
11	11	USA	Massachusetts Institute of Technology	8	1324
12	12	USA	Swarthmore College	7	605

=== World Finals Baku (2025) ===
The 49th ICPC World Championship was held in Baku, Azerbaijan, from August 31 to September 5, 2025, hosted by ADA University in partnership with the Central Bank of Azerbaijan.

139 teams competed to be World Champion. The winners were Saint Petersburg State University team named Polar Bear Transform. They solved 11 out of 12 problems. With only two minutes left on the contest ending, the team submitted the final problem's solution that sealed their victory. Gold medals also went to the teams from Japan and China: The University of Tokyo, Beijing Jiaotong University, and Tsinghua University.

Final standings
	Rank in Final	Country	Institution	Number of solved problems	Penalty time
01	1	Russia	Saint Petersburg State University	11	1478
02	2	Japan	The University of Tokyo	10	1116
03	3	China	Beijing Jiaotong University	10	1425
04	4	China	Tsinghua University	9	865
05	5	China	Peking University	9	887
06	6	USA	Harvard University	9	995
07	7	Croatia	University of Zagreb	9	1075
08	8	USA	Massachusetts Institute of Technology	9	1123
09	9	China	University of Science and Technology of China	9	1128
10	10	South Korea	Seoul National University	9	1133
11	11	Serbia	University of Novi Sad	9	1175
12	12	Russia	Saratov State University	9	1191

== Summary ==
Several time winners
Wins	Country	Institution	Most recent
7	Russia	ITMO University	2017
5	Russia	Saint Petersburg State University	2025
3	China	Shanghai Jiao Tong University	2010
3	United States	Stanford University	1991
2	China	Peking University	2024
2	United States	Massachusetts Institute of Technology	2022
2	Russia	Moscow State University	2019
2	Poland	University of Warsaw	2007
2	Canada	University of Waterloo	1999
2	United States	California Institute of Technology	1988
2	United States	Washington University in St. Louis	1980

Winner by year
Year	Country	Institution	Host country	Host city
2025	Russia	Saint Petersburg State University	Azerbaijan	Baku
2024	China	Peking University	Kazakhstan	Astana
2023	Russia	National Research University Higher School of Economics	Egypt	Luxor
2022	China	Peking University	Egypt	Luxor
2021	United States	Massachusetts Institute of Technology	Bangladesh	Dhaka
2020	Russia	Nizhny Novgorod State University	Russia	Moscow
2019	Russia	Moscow State University	Portugal	Porto
2018	Russia	Moscow State University	China	Beijing
2017	Russia	ITMO University	United States	Rapid City
2016	Russia	Saint Petersburg State University	Thailand	Phuket
2015	Russia	ITMO University	Morocco	Marrakesh
2014	Russia	Saint Petersburg State University	Russia	Yekaterinburg
2013	Russia	ITMO University	Russia	Saint Petersburg
2012	Russia	ITMO University	Poland	Warsaw
2011	China	Zhejiang University	United States	Orlando
2010	China	Shanghai Jiao Tong University	China	Harbin
2009	Russia	ITMO University	Sweden	Stockholm
2008	Russia	ITMO University	Canada	Banff
2007	Poland	University of Warsaw	Japan	Urayasu
2006	Russia	Saratov State University	United States	San Antonio
2005	China	Shanghai Jiao Tong University	China	Shanghai
2004	Russia	ITMO University	Czech Republic	Prague
2003	Poland	University of Warsaw	United States	Beverly Hills
2002	China	Shanghai Jiao Tong University	United States	Honolulu
2001	Russia	Saint Petersburg State University	Canada	Vancouver
2000	Russia	Saint Petersburg State University	United States	Orlando
1999	Canada	University of Waterloo	Netherlands	Eindhoven
1998	Czech Republic	Charles University	United States	Atlanta
1997	United States	Harvey Mudd College	United States	San Jose
1996	United States	University of California, Berkeley	United States	Philadelphia
1995	Germany	Albert-Ludwigs-Universität	United States	Nashville
1994	Canada	University of Waterloo	United States	Phoenix
1993	United States	Harvard University	United States	Indianapolis
1992	Australia	University of Melbourne	United States	Kansas City
1991	United States	Stanford University	United States	San Antonio
1990	New Zealand	University of Otago	United States	Washington, D.C.
1989	United States	University of California, Los Angeles	United States	Louisville
1988	United States	California Institute of Technology	United States	Atlanta
1987	United States	Stanford University	United States	St. Louis
1986	United States	California Institute of Technology	United States	Cincinnati
1985	United States	Stanford University	United States	New Orleans
1984	United States	Johns Hopkins University	United States	Philadelphia
1983	United States	University of Nebraska–Lincoln	United States	Melbourne
1982	United States	Baylor University	United States	Indianapolis
1981	United States	University of Missouri–Rolla	United States	St. Louis
1980	United States	Washington University in St. Louis	United States	Kansas City
1979	United States	Washington University in St. Louis	United States	Dayton
1978	United States	Massachusetts Institute of Technology	United States	Detroit
1977	United States	Michigan State University	United States	Atlanta

Country wins
Wins	Country	Most Recent Win	No. of Years Participated
18	United States	2021	47
17	Russia	2025	29 (since 1996)
6	China	2024	
2	Poland	2007	
2	Canada	1999	
1	Czech Republic	1998	
1	Germany	1995	
1	Australia	1992	
1	New Zealand	1990	

== See also ==
- ACM Student Research Competition
- Competitive programming, a type of mind sport involved in programming competitions
- Online judge, a service to practice for programming contests and run them online
- PC², the Programming Contest Control System in support of Computer Programming Contest activities (used at ICPC World Finals until 2008 and also in 2025)
