= HMMT =

High school mathematics competition

HMMT is a semiannual (biannual) high school mathematics competition that started in 1998. The Autumn (November) tournament is held annually at Harvard University in Cambridge, Massachusetts, and the Spring (February) tournament is held annually at MIT, also in Cambridge. The competition is organized and executed in a tightly-knit partnership between the corresponding student groups at Harvard and at MIT. From problem writing to logistics, the competition is handled primarily by undergraduate students at the universities.

== Naming ==
HMMT was initially started as the Harvard-MIT Mathematics Tournament in 1998, and is frequently still referred to as such by much of the math community. In 2019, it rebranded as just HMMT to meet requirements set forth by the universities, making the name an orphan initialism.

== Tournament format ==
The table below summarizes the similarities and differences between the November and February tournaments. The most up-to-date comparison can be found on the HMMT website.

	November	February
Individual rounds	General, Theme	Algebra, Geometry, and Combinatorics
Team round	Short answer	Proofs
Guts round	12 sets of 3	9 sets of 4
Team size for ranked teams	4-6	6-8
Difficulty	mid-AMC to upper-AIME	mid-AIME to olympiad
Eligibility	All currently-enrolled secondary school students under the age of 21	
Friday Night Events location	MIT	Harvard
Saturday Tournament location	Harvard	MIT
Sunday Education location	Harvard	MIT

=== Individual rounds ===
The Individual rounds contain the General and Theme exams for November, and the Algebra, Geometry, and Combinatorics exams for February. Each exam is 50 minutes in length and contains 10 short answer questions. Answers can be any real number or even an algebraic expression. Before 2012, competitors had the option to choose between a comprehensive General exam or two specialized exams in Algebra, Geometry, Combinatorics, or Calculus for the February tournament.

Problems are weighted by their intended difficulty and number of solves. Each student competitor receives an Overall Individual superscore composed of their weighted scores on each Individual round exam. The scaled sum of the Overall Individual superscores on a team contributes up to 800 points (50%) to the Sweepstakes ranking.

=== Team round ===
The November tournament's Team round contains 10 short answer problems, similar to the Individual rounds. The problems themselves are more challenging than the Individual rounds' problems and each team works together to submit a single answer sheet. No proof experience is required for the November Team round.

The February tournament's Team round contains 10 proof-based problems. Responses on graded on both correctness and thoroughness. February Team round problems are among the very few in HMMT that can be awarded partial credit. The event is similar to an ARML Power Round, but the problems are fewer and more difficult. Teams must be comfortable with rigorous mathematical proofs in order to be successful.

The Team round contributes up to 400 points (25%) to the Sweepstakes ranking.

=== Guts round ===
The Guts round is an 80-minute team event with 36 short-answer questions on an assortment of subjects, divided into 12 groups of 3 (in November) or 9 groups of 4 (in February). The problems' difficulty and point values increase with each subsequent set, culminating in the final set of estimation problems, typically worth 20 points each. (The estimation problems are the only other problems with the potential for partial credit, along with the February Team round.)

Each team begins the round seated together, with at least one member in an exterior (aisle or front-row) seat. One representative from each team approaches a fixed grading station to pick up the team's first set of problems. Once the round starts, each representative returns to their team with the problems for the team to solve together. When the team is ready to move on to the next set, the representative approaches the grading station to submit their answers for the current set and pick up the questions for the next set. Teams cannot return to problems in sets they have already submitted. It is not expected that teams will finish all the problems in the 80 minutes of the exam.

Guts round submissions are graded and posted in real time, with students able to see their and others' progress through the round on the projected digital scoreboard. Parents, coaches, and chaperones are also able to view the scoreboard in a designated viewing area, separate from the competition rooms.

The Guts round contributes up to 400 points (25%) to the Sweepstakes ranking.

=== Keynote speaker ===
Parents, coaches, chaperones, and non-competing students are also invited to a keynote speaker session, featuring various members of the academic mathematics community. The most recent keynote speaker in February 2024 was Jeffery Yu, HMMT Tournament Director Emeritus and current physics doctoral student in the Joint Center for Quantum Information and Computer Science at the University of Maryland, College Park. His talk was titled, Math Beyond Competitions (for advanced competitors).

=== Other events ===
Both HMMT tournaments have optional events the day before and the day after each tournament for competing and non-competing students. The top 50 student competitors for HMMT February are also invited to take the remote-proctored Invitational Competition (HMIC) in April.

Friday Night Events are held in evening prior to the tournament, including a free dinner and social for students and coaches. After dinner, HMMT's corporate sponsors and volunteers offer a wide variety of engaging and fun Mini-Events for students. Some corporate sponsors also hold signature events as part of the Mini-Events, such as Jane Street's Estimathon, Five Rings's Integration Bee Qualifiers, Hudson River Trading's (HRT) Puzzle Hunt, and more. Students, parents, and coaches also have the chance to speak with representatives from the corporate sponsors, including many alums of the HMMT organizer community, as well as pick up a plethora of merchandise.

Sunday Education events are held in the morning and afternoon of the day after the tournament. Speakers hail from a variety of disciplines and schools, but the majority are math and computer science affiliates at Harvard and MIT.

The HMIC is a five-question, four-hour, remote-proctored proof contest started in 2013. The problems are typically quite difficult: competitors can typically attain a high ranking by fully solving three problems. It is typically held in late March or early/mid April.

== Scoring and awards ==
HMMT uses a post-weighted scoring algorithm to rank the competitors on the Individual Rounds. While the problems on these tests are weighted according to difficulty, they are mainly done so after the testing has completed. As explained here, this helps create a fairer method for weighting problems according to their actual difficulty (as determined by how often and by whom they were solved) as opposed to their perceived difficulty by the problem writers. The weights assigned to each problem are calculated using a scoring algorithm that takes into account which problems were solved by which students. The weights of the problems on the Team and Guts Rounds are predetermined and provided during the exams.

Prizes are awarded to the ten highest-scoring individuals overall, the top ten scorers on each of the subject rounds, the ten highest-scoring teams on the Team round, and the ten highest-scoring teams on the Guts round. The top ten teams overall will be named the Sweepstakes winners. The calculation of Sweepstakes scores is roughly half individual round performance and half collaborative round performance.

== Difficulty ==
The difficulty of the February tournament is compared to that of ARML, the AIME, or the Mandelbrot Competition, though it is considered to be a bit harder than these contests. The contest organizers state that, "HMMT, arguably one of the most difficult math competitions in the United States, is geared toward students who can comfortably and confidently solve 6 to 8 problems correctly on the American Invitational Mathematics Examination (AIME)." As with most high school competitions, knowledge of calculus is not strictly required; however, calculus may be necessary to solve a select few of the more difficult problems on the Individual and Team rounds.

The November tournament is comparatively easier, with problems more in the range of AMC to AIME. The most challenging November problems are roughly similar in difficulty to the lower-middle difficulty problems of the February tournament.

== HMMT November Results ==
Year	Sweepstakes Champion	Individual Champion	Team Round Champion	Guts Round Champion
2025	Brunswick School A	Leo Wu	Brunswick School A	Ward Melville Math Team D
2024	Shanghai High School Stallions	Yichen Gong	Lexington Gamma	Shanghai High School Stallions
2023	PRISMS Falcons	Sicheng Zhou	PRISMS Falcons	PRISMS Falcons
2022	Westchester Area Math Circle	Qiao Zhang	Westchester Area Math Circle	Texas Tornado
2021	Gunn Black	Steve Zhang	PRISMS 2	RSM A
2020	November 2020 was run with no official results due to COVID-19			
2019	PRISMS Falcons	Yichen Xiao	Long Island Super	PRISMS Falcons
2018	Texas Tornado	Raymond Feng	Texas Tornado	Texas Tornado
2017	Yu's Alligator	Thomas Draper	Yu's Alligator	NNHS & Friends
2016	Four Seasons Education2	HouTin Chau	PuiChing	Yu's Alligator
2015	Shenzhen Foreign Languages School	Yi Fan Zhu	Shenzhen Foreign Languages School	Shenzhen Foreign Languages School
2014	Phillips Exeter Academy	Jianqiao Xia	Phillips Exeter Academy	International Academy East
2013	Beijing STFX	Geyang Qin	Phillips Exeter Academy	Beijing STFX
2012	Western Mass ARML	Dhroova Aiylam	Phillips Exeter Academy	Western Mass ARML
2011	Phillips Exeter Academy	Forest Tong	Lexington High School	Brookline High School
2010	Phillips Exeter Academy	Ravi Jagadeesan	Phillips Exeter Academy	Lexington High School
2009	ABRHS	Xiaoyu He	Phillips Exeter Academy	ABRHS
2008	Western Mass ARML	Sam Trabucco	Western Mass ARML	Westford Academy

== HMMT February Results ==
Year	Sweepstakes Champion	Individual Champion	Team Round Champion	Guts Round Champion
2026	Washington Gold A1	Alexander Wang	PEA Chestnuts	Washington Gold A1
2025	AlphaStar Academy AIR	Alexander Wang	Lehigh Valley Fire	Essential Academy1 (Unranked *)
2024	Lehigh Valley Fire	Xiaohan Zhang	Lehigh Valley Fire	Lehigh Valley Fire
2023	LV Fire	Jason Mao	Random Math Team A	AlphaStar Academy AIR
2022	Texas Momentum A	Luke Robitaille	Texas Momentum A	Texas Momentum A
2021	Motown All Stars A	Luke Robitaille	Motown All Stars A	Texas Momentum A
2020	Texas Momentum A	Luke Robitaille	Texas Momentum A	Texas Momentum A
2019	Texas Momentum A	Daniel Zhu	Texas Momentum A	MoCoSwaggaSquad
2018	AlphaStar Academy A* Air	Luke Robitaille	MoCoSwaggaSquad	Thomas Jefferson High School for Science and Technology
2017	Phillips Exeter Academy	Yuan Yao	Star League A-Star	Phillips Exeter Academy
2016	Phillips Exeter Academy	Yuan Yao	Phillips Exeter Academy	Florida A
2015	Phillips Exeter Academy	Andrew He	Star League A-Star	Phillips Exeter Academy
2014	Phillips Exeter Academy	Scott Wu	Phillips Exeter Academy	Star League A-Star
2013	Phillips Exeter Academy	James Tao	Phillips Exeter Academy	Phillips Exeter Academy
2012	Phillips Exeter Academy	Xiaoyu He	Phillips Exeter Academy	Phillips Exeter Academy
2011	Saratoga High School/SFBA	Xiaoyu He	North Carolina	Saratoga High School/SFBA
2010	Phillips Exeter Academy	Ben Gunby	TJHSST	AAST
2009	TJHSST	Ice Pasupat	Lehigh Valley ARML	Lehigh Valley ARML
2008	Phillips Exeter Academy	Brian Hamrick	New York City Math Team	Quagga
2007	The WOOTlings	Arnav Tripathy	The WOOTlings	TJHSST
2006	Phillips Exeter Academy	Nimish Ramanlal	TJHSST	AAST
2005	Phillips Exeter Academy	Thomas Mildorf	TJHSST	Florida
2004	TJHSST	Tiankai Liu	TJHSST	Phillips Exeter Academy
2003	TJHSST	Tony Zhang	TJHSST	AAST
2002	Newton South High School	Ricky Liu	Newton South High School	Lexington High School
2001	Lexington High School	Ricky Liu	Lexington High School	Newton South High School
2000	Newton South High School	Ricky Liu	Newton South High School	Newton South High School
1999	Newton South High School	n/a	Newton South High School	n/a
1998	Lexington High School	n/a	Lexington High School	n/a

== Sponsors ==
HMMT is typically sponsored by a combination of school math departments and various industry companies. The full list, which changes annually, can be found on the HMMT homepage.

== Other competitions ==
HMMT hosts staff exchange programs with the Princeton University Mathematics Competition (PUMaC), Carnegie Mellon Informatics and Mathematics Competition (CMIMC), and Stanford Math Tournament (SMT) to further collaboration between the competitions' organizers. During exchanges, participants ranging from first-year members to more senior officers spend the weekend proctoring, grading, and otherwise volunteering at the host competition day-of.
