= Baton Rouge Magnet High School =

Public magnet school in Baton Rouge, Louisiana, United States

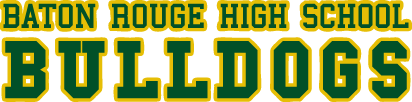

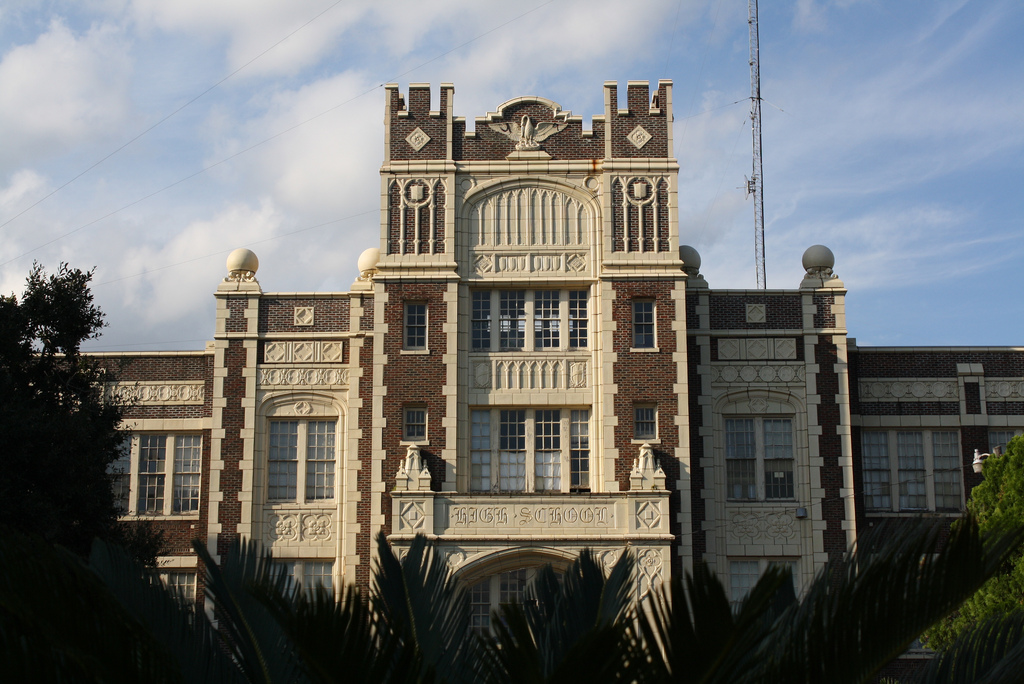
- The facade of the school before renovation

Location
- 2825 Government Street; Baton Rouge, Louisiana 70806; United States

Information
- Type: Public, Magnet
- Established: 1880; 146 years ago
- School district: East Baton Rouge Parish School System
- Principal: Nanette McCann
- Faculty: 80.42 (FTE)
- Grades: 9–12
- Enrollment: 1,582 (2022–2023)
- Student to teacher ratio: 19.67
- Campus size: 12 acres (0.05 km^{2})
- Campus type: Urban
- Colors: Green and gold
- Athletics conference: LHSAA 5A
- Mascot: Bulldog
- Nickname: Bulldogs
- Yearbook: Fricassee
- Website: ebrschools.org/schools/brmh/
- Baton Rouge High School
- U.S. National Register of Historic Places
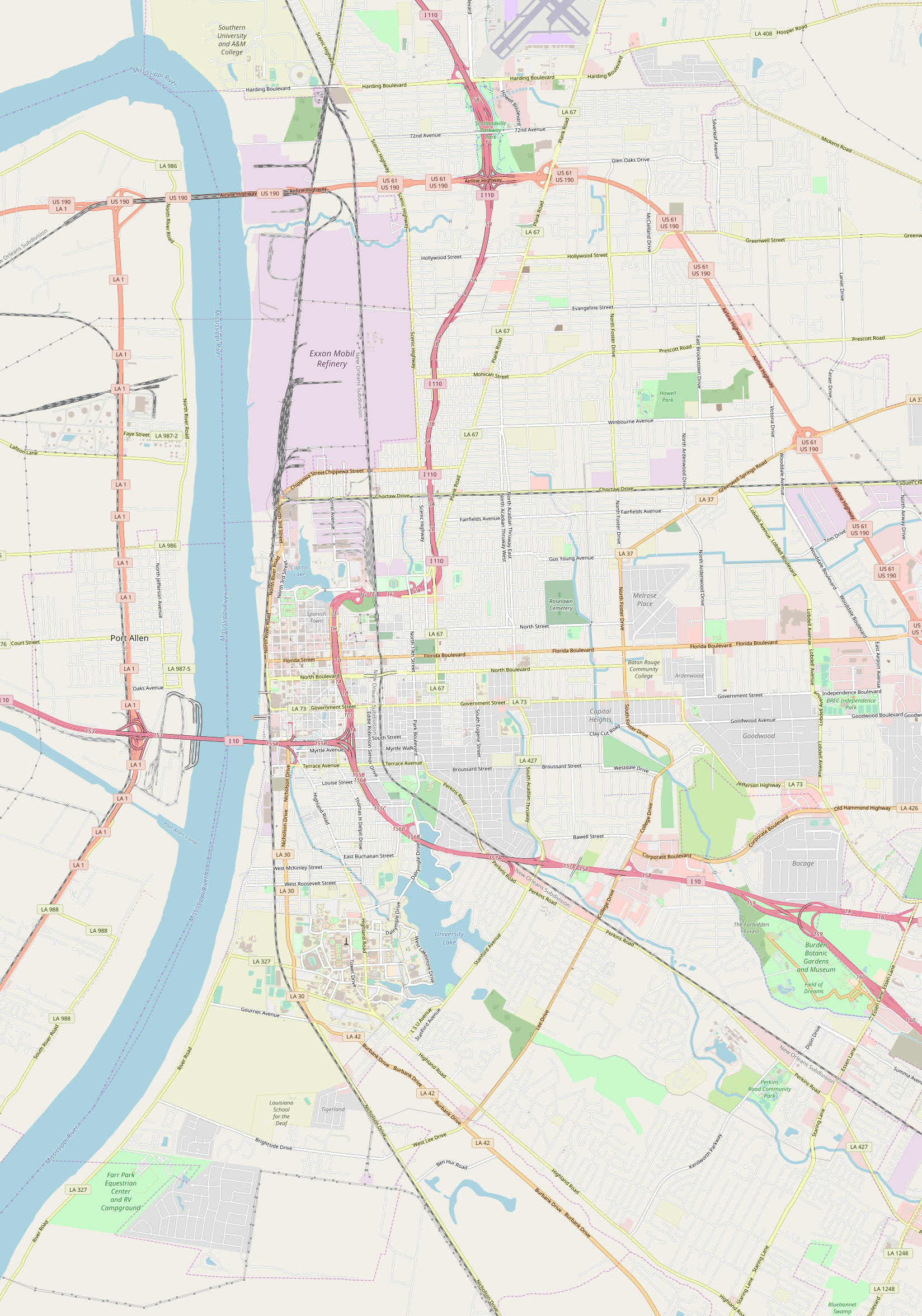
- Location within Baton Rouge
- Location: 2825 Government Street, Baton Rouge, Louisiana
- Coordinates: 30°26′43″N 91°09′35″W
- Area: 8.5 acres (3.4 ha)
- Built: 1926
- Architect: William T. Nolan
- Architectural style: Late Gothic Revival, Neo-Gothic
- NRHP reference No.: 86003130
- Added to NRHP: November 06, 1986

Baton Rouge Magnet High School (BRMHS or Baton Rouge High) is a public magnet school in Baton Rouge, Louisiana, United States, founded in 1880. It is part of the East Baton Rouge Parish School System with a student body of approximately 1500 students. The current building was built in 1926, and, as Baton Rouge High School, was listed on the National Register of Historic Places in 1986. The campus underwent a two-year renovation and expansion starting in 2010, resulting in the addition of two new wings to the main building. This renovation was completed and the school reopened in fall 2012. Baton Rouge High is also one of the highest-ranked schools in the state, and consistently wins state-level academic competitions. The school requires students to pass enrollment standards and exceed graduation standards. As a result, nearly all graduating students attend college.

== History ==
In 1903, T. H. Harris was named principal of Baton Rouge High School. Five years later, he became the state education superintendent and held that post until 1940.

The present campus was put into use in 1925 (although some sources cite 1927 or 1928 as the year the new building opened) when the main four-story building was built. Additional buildings were added and renovations made during the 1950s. By 1972, the present facilities were completed and air conditioning was installed. In the fall of 1976, the school began operating under the new Magnet School Curriculum, and the Class of 1980 became the first graduating class to attend all four full years under the Magnet Program. Numerous district and state championships have been won as is attested by the vast collection of trophies on view in the lobby. Though the major sports of football, basketball, and baseball were discontinued in 1976, the individual and life-time sports have continued a tradition of winning district and state championships. State and district rally honors have increased, as have the number of National Merit Students among the student body.

The main three to four story neo-Gothic brick and terra cotta building, along with a 8.5 acres (3.4 ha) portion of the campus, was added to the National Register of Historic Places on November 6, 1986.

The 4th floor of the school used to be home to the band and orchestra, but is now closed off to the student body. Elvis Presley played on the Baton Rouge High stage with Faron Young on May 2, 1955 The school also was used in 2009 as a location for the filming of parts of the film Ticking Clock.

The school had been temporarily moved to the old Lee High School building, due to renovations being done on the 1925 campus. Students returned to the renovated campus on August 8, 2012.

In 2025, the school, along with other areas around Baton Rouge, was used as the main filming location for the movie Re-Election, starring Tony Danza.

== Distinctions and awards ==
The school was awarded the Blue Ribbon for Academic Excellence for the school years 1982–83 and 2003–04. The school offers 27 Advanced Placement classes, including Science Lab, with an additional American Government course speculated for 2008–2009. It has 20 honors courses, two dual enrollment courses through Baton Rouge Community College, and three foreign languages; French I-V, Spanish I-V, Latin I-V. Greek is offered sporadically and was last offered in 2012–2013. Due to faculty shortage, since 2007 Russian is no longer available. Similarly, German is no longer available as of 2022. Having a college-preparatory Magnet program, the school employs a rigorous curriculum resulting in almost all of its graduates attending college. The 270 students graduating in 2006 were offered over $8 million in college scholarships, with almost all going on to enter college.

Four graduates have also gone on to be named Rhodes Scholars after college.

It received a special award in 2004 from the Kennedy Center in Washington, D.C., distinguishing it as one of five schools in the nation excelling in performing arts. It was one of two high schools to receive this award. On March 21, 2005, the school performed and displayed aspects of its arts and performances programs on one of the Kennedy Center's Millennium Stages.

The school is one of the few high schools in the nation to offer two student run radio stations and is the only one with both AM and FM stations. The original FM station, WBRH, was joined in 1993 by an AM station, KBRH. They are both non-profit radio stations and are run with the financial support of the listening community. They publicly broadcast jazz on WBRH 90.3 MHz, and classic R&B and local music on KBRH 1260 kHz.

Awards

- 1982 Redbook Magazine - Top 100 High Schools in America
- 1983 Blue Ribbon School - U.S. Dept of Education
- 2003 Blue Ribbon School - U.S. Dept of Education
- 2004 Creative School Ticket of Excellence
- 2004 Louisiana Dept of Education - Five Star School of Academic Excellence
- 2004 Kennedy Center School of Distinction Creative Ticket Award
- 2005 Magnet Schools of America - Distinction Award
- 2005 Louisiana Dept of Education - Five Star School of Academic Excellence
- 2006 Magnet Schools of America - Distinction Award
- 2006 Louisiana Dept of Education - Five Star School of Academic Excellence
- 2006 Siemens Award for Advanced Placement
- 2006 Magnet Schools of America. Magnet School of Distinction
- 2007 Louisiana Dept of Education - Five Star School of Academic Excellence
- 2007 Presidential Award for Excellence in Mathematics & Science Teaching
- 2008 U.S. News & World Report. Best High Schools, Silver Designation
- 2008 Magnet Schools of America - Distinction Award
- 2009 U.S. News & World Report. Best High Schools, Silver Designation
- 2010 National Magnet Schools of America - Magnet school Principal of the year
- 2010 National Magnet Schools of America - Excellence Award
- 2010 U.S. News & World Report. Best High Schools, Silver Designation
- 2011 U.S. Presidential Scholar
- 2011 Newsweek. #122-ranked High School in the US (3rd highest SAT average amongst 500 schools)
- 2012 State Science Olympiad
- 2012 Newsweek America's Best High Schools
- 2012 Magnet Schools of America - Distinction Award
- 2012 U.S. Presidential Scholar
- 2013 Louisiana State Principal of the Year
- 2015 Blue Ribbon School - U.S. Dept of Education
- 2021 Blue Ribbon School - U.S. Dept of Education

== Sports and athletics ==
Bulldog mascot

Baton Rouge Magnet High athletics competes in the LHSAA. The school has an unusual athletics program in that since 1976, it has not fielded a varsity football, basketball, or baseball team. This was a result of the school switching to the magnet program that year, changing the school's official name from Baton Rouge High School to Baton Rouge Magnet High School.

=== Athletic history ===
The school has played in the 5A classification, the highest in the LHSAA, since moving up from 4A in 1998. It has won numerous state championships in many sports. Gymnastics and track and field programs are especially strong.

In 2003, the school had a banner year for sports, winning 5 state championships: women's outdoor track, men's outdoor track, women's gymnastics, men's gymnastics, and women's cross country.

The women's swim team was state runner-up in 2005. Joanne Chien, class of 2010, won 5 individual state titles in her career, including setting a 5A record in the 100-yard backstroke in 2007.

The school's football team won eight state championships in 1909, 1911, 1913, 1914, 1917, 1919, 1944 (Class 2A) and 1964 (Class 3A) before being disbanded in 1976. The team also made one unsuccessful appearance in the state title game in 1954 (Class 3A).

The school's basketball team won State Championships in 1968 (3A), 1961 (3A), 1954 (2A), 1950 (2A), 1932 (1A), 1911 (2A), 1910 (1A), 1909 (1A)

The school has won the Southern Quality Ford Cup (previously Picadilly Cup), the all-sports trophy, several times, despite not competing in football, basketball, or baseball.

The cross-country program was a dominant force in the 1980s and early 1990s as the men's team won 9 consecutive state titles from 1980 to 1988. The women's program won 6 state titles and placed numerous individual state champions.

In recent times, the women's outdoor track and field program has been one of the most dominant in the state, winning state championships in 2003, 2004, 2009, 2010, 2011 and 2012. They were also state runners-up in 2005 and 2006.

The men's gymnastics team, as of the end of the 2010–2011 school year, under the tutelage of longtime coach Kevin Nee, has won 7 of the last 9 LHSAA state championships, including four straight from 2002 to 2005. In 2010, team Captain Chris Chu, class of 2011, won first all-around in the LHSAA state championship. The women's team has placed in the top 3 in the state for 6 of the last 9 years, with one state championship in 2003.

The men's cross country team has a two-time 5A state champion in Philipp Goettert (2006, 2007). Saul Rothschild was also a two-time state cross-country champion, in 1980 and 1981, when BRHS was classified as 3A (and the largest classification at the time was 4A).

The soccer team competes in district 5 of the 5A classification of the Louisiana High School Athletic Association. The girls' golf team placed 3rd in the 2010 Baton Rouge Metro High School Championship.

The most recent addition to the athletic roster is men's bowling, which began play in the 2005–2006 school year, the same year the LHSAA held its first state championships in the sport.

In addition, the school has an intramural sports program consisting of American flag football, basketball, and volleyball.

== Visual and performing arts ==
The school has music programs, including an award-winning choir, a jazz band and concert band, and a string orchestra.

The Choral Department has been directed by Robbie Giroir, the organist at St. Joseph Cathedral, for thirty years. They host an annual candlelight Christmas Concert in downtown Baton Rouge. Giroir has taken the Festival Singers, a small vocal ensemble, to venues around the world.

=== Choral studies ===
The BRMHS Department of Choral Studies offers choral singing, solo vocal literature, music theory, and the art of English handbell ringing. In 2007 the program had over seventy-five choristers.

The Choral Union is a principle choral ensemble of forty auditioned choristers. They perform in the Fall and Spring Concerts held in the Chapel of St. Alban's on the LSU Campus, and the annual formal Candlelight Concert traditionally held in St. Joseph Cathedral in downtown Baton Rouge.

The Choral Union and Festival Singers have also performed in Carnegie Hall, Lincoln Center, and St. Patrick's Cathedral in New York City. The Festival Singers have toured the United Kingdom where solo choral performances were given at Winchester Cathedral, St. Paul's Cathedral, Ely Cathedral, and the World War II Memorial Chapel (Ely). In 2005, the Festival Singers performed a concert tour of Germany and Austria. In 2009, the Festival Singers went to Spain to perform in numerous cathedrals in cities such as Sevilla, Madrid, Toledo, Escorial, and Segovia. In 2011, they performed in Prague and Budapest. In February 2013, the Festival Singers traveled to Italy, where they toured and performed in the cities of Florence, Siena, Rome, and Pompeii, with a visit to the Vatican City where they performed in the final public audience of Pope Benedict XVI and sang a mass at St. Peter's Basilica. In 2015, the Festival Singers traveled to Ireland, where they toured Armagh, Downpatrick, Galway, Connemara, Bunratty, Cashel, and Dublin. The BRMHS Festival Singers travel internationally every two years and are planning to travel to the Netherlands and Belgium in 2017.

Through competitive auditions, many BRMHS choristers are chosen for All-State and All-District Honor Choirs. Under the tenure of Robbie Giroir, the Department of Choral Studies has sung over twenty major choral works by noted composers and has produced over fifteen major musical productions on the BRMHS stage.

Many school Choristers have gone on to professional performing and music education careers that include Broadway and University Professors.

=== Performing arts ===
The school has the only student operated AM and FM radio stations in the country. The school was honored with a "Creative Ticket in the Arts" in 2005 by the Louisiana Division of the Arts and nominated for recognition on a national level.

In addition to the radio training program, the department offers multi-year courses in choral and instrumental music, drama, stagecraft, ballet, and television production.

The drama department produces several main stage and small stage plays each year. These include a Shakespearean play and a winter production in conjunction with the dance department. The later is performed each year for audiences of local elementary school children. The dance department also produces its own recitals, and many of the dancers perform with other dance companies.

The school offers instrumental courses including woodwind, jazz, and strings.

=== Piano Department ===
The piano department has a lab consisting of 19 full-size instruments, including Yamaha Clavinovas, and Rolands, as well as three 64-key Wurlitzer keyboards. Advanced students present two recitals each year. Students also perform for retirement homes and community functions. All styles of music are studied.

=== Visual arts ===
Visual artists at the school can take four years of art classes. Student artwork is displayed frequently at the East Baton Rouge Parish School Board office and various Baton Rouge galleries, and the department has its own show at the school each spring.

In 2008, art club members are finished a full-color mural on an outside wall of the school Performing Arts building. This mural no longer exists after the renovation, which left only the front part of the building intact.

=== Orchestra ===
The orchestra at Baton Rouge High, under the direction of Mr. Christopher Frazier, is also an award-winning program. They have performed in Carnegie Hall and at the Lincoln Center in New York City. The group has also participated in musical festival events in Atlanta, Memphis, and Dallas. The orchestra has over 100 members and also performs with the McKinley High Orchestra to form the BRM Orchestra. Placement in the orchestra of Baton Rouge Magnet High is determined by audition.

== Renovation project ==
A large renovation and reconstruction project by the East Baton Rouge Parish School Board commenced in August 2010 and was completed in time for the start of the 2012–2013 school year. The project consisted of a complete renovation of the landmark school structure, and a demolition and reconstruction of the remaining structures. During the project, all students and staff were relocated to the previously shuttered Lee High School.

The Baton Rouge High Parent Faculty Club lead the way for safe storage of memorabilia items during renovations. Items were moved to storage prior to renovations and were safely returned when the renovations were completed.

== Extracurricular activities ==
Baton Rouge High School has many clubs for students to choose from. Clubs range from academic to social, with 78 clubs available. The following is a brief list of clubs at the school:

- The academic clubs include:
  - Beta Club, Chess Club, Computer Science Club, Epidemiology Club, Law Club, Literary Travel, Mechanical Tech, Media Tech, Mock Trial, Mu Alpha Theta, National Honor Society, Quiz Bowl, and Science Club.
- The athletic organization clubs include:
  - Dance Club, Frisbee, Gymnastics, Intramural Club, and SCUBA Club.
- The language and culture oriented clubs include:
  - African Heritage, Arabic Club, Chinese Club, French Club, German Club, International Cultural Association (ICA), Junior Classical League, Muslim Student Association, Spanish Club, and Indian Student Association.
- The political clubs include:
  - Amnesty International, Cloud Watching Club (Dreaming of a Better World) (formally Gay-Straight Alliance), Invisible Children, Teenage Republicans, and Young Democrats.
- The service-oriented clubs include:
  - 4-H, Best Buddies, Cancer Club, DECA (organization), Interact, Key Club, Red Cross, and Habitat for Humanity.
- The student organization clubs include:
  - Hi-Y, Tri-Hi-Y, Students Against Destructive Decisions (SADD), and Student Government Association (SGA).
- Other clubs include:
  - Anime Club, Film Club, Awakening, the Piano Club, Potpourri (the literary publication produced by Baton Rouge High students), The Musician's Guild, WBRH/Radio Club, Improv Club, Thespian Club, Nintendo Club, and Diplomacy Club.

Some of the most active clubs include Beta Club, Frisbee, ICA, Mu Alpha Theta, Junior Classical League and Habitat for Humanity. ICA and African Heritage co-host a cultural show each spring which features presentations by students from various, diverse backgrounds sharing cultural experiences. Beta Club, Mu Alpha Theta, and the Junior Classical League always attend their club's state convention, often sweeping many awards for their chapter.

BETA, Mu Alpha Theta, ICA, Hi-Y/Tri-Hi-Y, Frisbee, and Habitat for Humanity are the largest clubs at the school.

== The media center ==
The media center of Baton Rouge High boasts over 12,000 books and other volumes. The library and the adjoining lab have at least 45 computers, some are networked to a wireless network allowing access to laser printers, scanners, digital cameras and more.

== Traditions ==
=== Spirit Day ===
On one of the first Fridays after school begins, the school hosts a "Spirit Day" where each class represents their school spirit by wearing green and gold. Seniors traditionally wear completely outrageous costumes, including capes, Mitres, wigs, pom-poms, and matching shirts. A Spirit Assembly is held where each class is mocked by every other class.

=== Fall Fair ===
During the week leading up to Halloween, the school has a different costume theme for each day of the week. In the past, there has been a Toga Day, a Decades Day, and a Twin/Triplets/Duos/Famous Couples Day, a Pirates Vs. Ninjas Day and a Superheroes Day. The theme is changed each year by the Student Government Association. The last day of Fall Fair week is always Masquerade Day, where everyone wears whatever costume they so choose. On this day, students are dismissed from class early, and go out to enjoy Fall Fair in the courtyard. School clubs are allowed to register booths, and they come up with inventive ways to raise money for their club. German Club traditionally holds a "German Disco", while the Junior Classical League has held "Gladiator Fights" with pool noodles and cardboard shields.

== Notable alumni ==
- Johnny Bookman: former professional football player from 1957 to 1961
- Treva Brown: chemist for the United States Naval Research Laboratory
- Dr. Dave Chokshi: former health commissioner of New York City and White House fellow in the United States Department of Veterans Affairs
- Jimmy Clanton: 1950s & 60s swamp pop and R&B musician
- Jay Dardenne (Class of 1972): former Louisiana secretary of state, state senator and Lieutenant Governor of Louisiana; current Louisiana Commissioner of Administration
- Mike Futrell (Class of 1978): Louisiana state representative, lawyer
- Bobby Jindal (Class of 1988): former U.S. Congressman and Governor of Louisiana from 2008 to 2016.
- Dalton Jones (Class of 1961), former Major League Baseball player
- Karey Kirkpatrick: Screenwriter of Chicken Run, The Hitchhiker's Guide to the Galaxy, and Over the Hedge
- Wayne Kirkpatrick: Grammy-winning songwriter of "Change the World"
- Zack Kopplin (Class of 2011): science advocate
- Starr Long (Class of 1988): game developer, original Director of Ultima Online
- Henson Moore (Class of 1958), U.S. representative from Louisiana's 6th congressional district from 1975 to 1987
- Ken Phares (Class of 1969), professional football player
- Ronnie Quillian (Class of 1953), professional football player
- John Victor Parker (Class of 1945, 1928–2014), judge of the United States District Court for the Middle District of Louisiana from 1979 to 2014
- Bob Pettit (Class of 1950): NBA Hall of Fame basketball player (inducted 1970)
- Johnny Ramistella a.k.a. Johnny Rivers: 1950s & 60s rock & roll musician
- A. T. "Apple" Sanders, Jr., member of the Louisiana House of Representatives from East Baton Rouge Parish
- Jim Taylor (Class of 1954): NFL Pro Football Hall of Fame fullback (inducted 1976)
- Scott Wu, co-founder of Cognition AI and Lunchclub.

== See also ==
- National Register of Historic Places listings in East Baton Rouge Parish, Louisiana
