= Cowboy Space Corporation =

Renewable energy company

Cowboy Space Corporation.
- Formerly: Aetherflux Inc.
- Type: Private
- Industry: Renewable energy
- Founded: 2024; 2 years ago
- Founder: Baiju Bhatt
- Headquarters: San Carlos, California, U.S.
- Website: cowboyspace.com

Cowboy Space Corporation (previously Aetherflux Inc.) is an American renewable energy company founded by Baiju Bhatt, the co-founder and former co-chief executive officer of Robinhood.

Based in San Carlos, California, the company sought to expand upon and commercialize space-based solar power, the concept of collecting solar power in space with solar power satellites and transmitting it to Earth as Aetherflux.

However, in 2026 the company rebranded as the Cowboy Space Corporation and announced a rocket named Big Iron that would launch a constellation of AI data centers, abandoning the earlier solar plan.

== Background ==
In March 2024, Bhatt stepped down from his role at Robinhood to focus on an unnamed company, eventually revealing itself as Aetherflux. His interest in space stemmed from his father’s work as a scientist at NASA’s Langley Research Center.

== Aetherflux ==
In October 2024, Bhatt announced his new company Aetherflux. Aetherflux shared that it employed about 10 people. The company purchased a satellite bus from Apex, a satellite company of which Bhatt is an investor, and began designing the payload. Bhatt has committed around US$10 million of his own money to fund the company, and the company plans to undertake its first mission and space demonstration in early 2026.

One day after the company's announcement of public operations, on October 10, 2024, Aetherflux became a member of the Commercial Spaceflight Federation (CSF), an American aerospace industry group promoting the commercial space industry. Later in the month, the company announced that Daniel M. Gallagher, the chief legal officer of Robinhood Markets, joined Aetherflux as an advisor.

In April 2025, Bloomberg reported that Aetherflux had raised $50 million in Series A funding, co-led by Index Ventures and Interlagos, a venture capital firm created by former SpaceX leadership. Additional investment came from Breakthrough Energy Ventures, Andreessen Horowitz, New Enterprise Associates, Robinhood co-founder Vlad Tenev, Robinhood chief legal officer Daniel Gallagher, artist Jared Leto, and watchmaker François-Paul Journe. The company has raised $60 million to date. The United States Department of Defense’s Operational Energy Capability Improvement Fund (OECIF) approved Aetherflux’s space solar program for funding to develop a proof of concept demonstrating power transmission from low-earth-orbit to Earth.

In December 2025, the company announced its Galactic Brain project, which sought to bring an "orbital data center" into commercial operation by the first quarter of 2027, powered by its existing space-based solar energy infrastructure to fuel artificial intelligence.

=== Technology ===
The company planned to build a constellation of satellites that collected solar energy in space via solar panels, distributing the energy back to ground stations on Earth through infrared lasers. The approach differed from those explored by governments and universities, and called for transmission via infrared lasers instead of microwaves. Aetherflux’s satellites would have orbited in low-earth-orbit instead of geo-stationary orbit. The first applications of the company's technology would have been designed to deliver power for various United States military operations, remote research stations or remote mining applications.

Aetherflux planned to initially have compact, lightweight receivers which have a diameter “bigger than 10 meters", but Bhatt said that the company would have been able to reduce that diameter to “five to 10 meters, potentially even smaller than that.”
