= Sriram Krishnan =

Indian-American investor (born 1984)

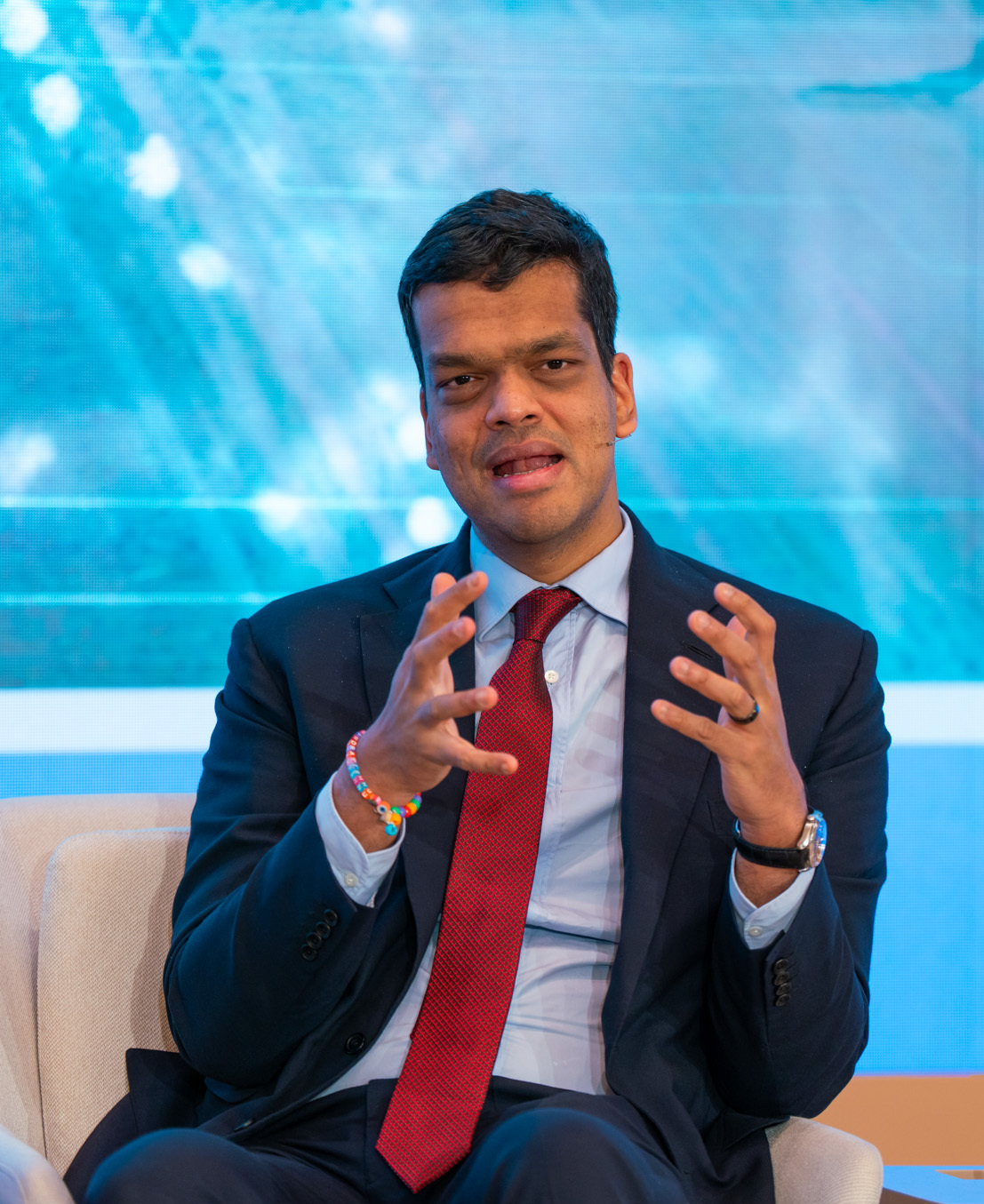
- Krishnan in 2025

Senior White House Policy Advisor on Artificial Intelligence
- In office January 20, 2025 – June 30, 2026
- President: Donald Trump
- Preceded by: Position established

Personal details
- Born: January 1984 Chennai, Tamil Nadu, India
- Spouse: Aarthi Ramamurthy (m. 2010)
- Education: SRM University (BTech)
- Occupation: Internet entrepreneur; investor; podcaster; clubhouse host
- Known for: General partner of Andreessen Horowitz; Co-host of The Aarthi and Sriram Show

Sriram Krishnan (born 1984) is an American tech executive, venture capitalist, and government official who served as the Senior White House Policy Advisor on Artificial Intelligence in the second administration of Donald Trump from January 2025 until June 2026. He later announced his intent to launch an unspecified new technology initiative regarding AI.

Before entering government, Krishnan held senior product roles at Microsoft, Meta (Facebook), Snap, and Twitter (now X). He served as a General Partner at Andreessen Horowitz from 2021 to 2024, where he invested in consumer, enterprise, and Web3 companies and led the firm's first international office in London. Krishnan was named a Time Person of the Year in 2025 as an "Architect of Artificial intelligence."

Krishnan, a U.S. citizen born in India, is also a podcaster, product manager and author. In 2026 he joined the National Economic Council.

== Early life and education ==
Krishnan was born in Chennai, India to Tamil parents. He earned his Bachelor of Technology in Information technology from SRM University (2001–2005), moved to the United States in 2007 to join Microsoft, and became a naturalized U.S. citizen in 2016.

== Private sector career ==
=== Microsoft ===
In 2007, Krishnan began his career at Microsoft as a program manager, initially working on Microsoft Popfly before joining the Windows Azure cloud computing team prior to its public launch. He also served as a program manager for Visual Studio.

=== Facebook ===
At Facebook, Krishnan built the Facebook Audience Network, a competitive platform to Google's ad technologies. At Twitter, he led product and core user experience, driving a 20% annual user growth rate and launching a redesigned home page and events experience.

=== Andreessen Horowitz ===
Krishnan was appointed a general partner of American venture capital firm Andreessen Horowitz ("a16z") in February 2021. He was anticipated to serve consumer and social markets, however he has also theorized on the impact of "deep tech" on society.

In 2023 he was appointed to lead the firm's London office, its first non-US location. The office is expected to serve Web3 investments as well as AI and other fields. Krishnan announced that he would leave the firm at the end of 2024.

=== Social media and AI ===
In 2022, various news media reported that Krishnan was assisting Elon Musk in the revamp of Twitter following Musk's takeover of the company. Additional reports named Krishnan as the leading candidate for the role of CEO of the newly private company.

Krishnan penned a 2023 New York Times opinion column regarding social media, AI, and related fields. He predicted a rise in the number and diversity of online spaces due to decentralization and platforms like Farcaster, Bluesky and Mastodon.

== Government career ==
=== Appointment ===
In 2024, the Financial Times reported that Krishnan was active in international affairs, reintroducing Boris Johnson to Elon Musk, following Musk's nomination to the proposed Department of Government Efficiency.

Krishnan was also reported as potentially leaving a16z at the end of the year to "be jumping into something I've wanted to spend [his] energy on," which was widely reported as being related to Musk's and Vivek Ramaswamy's work at DOGE. Others reported to be involved include Joe Lonsdale, Marc Andreesen, Bill Ackman, and Travis Kalanick.

On December 22, 2024, US president-elect Donald Trump announced that he would be Senior White House Policy Advisor on Artificial Intelligence in his incoming administration.

Krishnan received opposition from the MAGA wing of the Republican Party based on Krishnan's status as a naturalized US citizen born in India. In what Business Insider described as a "MAGA backlash", far-right activist Laura Loomer, MAGA-affiliated politician Matt Gaetz, and others voiced opposition to Krishnan—often connecting his Indian origin to disputes over other US immigration policies. Ro Khanna defended Krishnan as an example of "American exceptionalism", while Loomer replied that she was "not racist against Indians" despite her opposition to "slave laborers from India." The Wall Street Journal reported on other Tweets using racially-charged language in describing Indian-born figures.

=== Service ===
On February 6, 2025, Reuters reported that Krishnan would be accompanying Vice President Vance to the Paris AI Summit, a "major artificial intelligence" event later that month. Other members of the White House Office of Science and Technology Policy would also be joining the event with around 100 other countries to "focus on AI's potential."

Krishnan joined a U.S. technology policy delegation to the Middle East in advance of President Trump's visit in May 2025. Conducting "AI diplomacy," Krishnan negotiated the spread of U.S. AI technologies with Crown Prince Mohammed bin Salman of Saudi Arabia, as well as other means to strengthen bilateral trade in artificial intelligence technologies. He explained that the goal of the diplomatic mission was that "we want American A.I. to spread."

Krishnan, along with David Sacks and Michael Kratsios, were credited as authors of the American AI Action Plan released in July 2025. The plan is "the administration’s most significant policy directive" regarding artificial intelligence; it calls for financing to support the global spread of American AI models and a policy to enforce neutrality in models. The Washington Post referred to the plan as a "bold action to ensure that American AI remains at the cutting edge." The AI Action Plan is a continuation of prior efforts to reduce barriers to U.S. production of AI systems and the removal of rules that were considered to hinder such growth. He was described in Time as providing the "wake-up call that we needed" to the other AI builders, leading to "a multiyear, $500 billion initiative dubbed Stargate" to push American-made AI, as well as numerous other AI initiatives. Also in December 2025, President Trump said of Krishnan, "without him, things on AI would not function well" and cited Krishnan as the leading figure behind the American executive order on AI.

As the leader of the United States' policy team regarding artificial intelligence, Krishnan plays "a significant role in shaping the administration’s approach to AI and driving measures to advance federal adoption of AI." The role calls for removing barriers to AI adoption within the government, driving vendors toward solutions suitable for federal needs, designing sensible regulation of private-sector AI, and conducting "AI diplomacy". He has stated a policy goal of "reinvigorating US dominance in emerging technologies," including AI. He also represents the United States' interests in AI abroad, such as at the Paris AI Summit. He is one of the authors of the American "AI Action Plan" released in July, 2025, which he contends is necessary to win the "existential race with China" for AI supremacy.

Later in 2025, at the POLITICO AI & Tech Summit, Krishnan called national AI development "an existential race with China." He suggested that private companies are best positioned to create new models, quipping "let them cook." He further suggested that state-by-state regulation of AI technologies may hinder national AI competitiveness. Also in 2025, at the Axios AI+ Summit, Krishnan stated that the United States and China are in a race for AI supremacy, in which the winner will be judged by market share. Winning the race is a "business strategy" to Krishnan.

=== Recognition ===
Krishnan was named in the 2025 Time Person of the Year article as an "AI Architect".

=== Departure ===
He stepped down from his White House role effective June 30, 2026. Following his resignation, he described the administration's reluctance to over-regulate AI by stating that that under Trump "there will not be an FDA for AI" and that "this administration, [the] president, from day one has been against burdensome, onerous, bureaucratic red tape."

== Media ==
In early 2021, Krishnan and his wife, Aarthi Ramamurthy, launched a Clubhouse talk show that "focuses on organic conversations on anything from startups to venture capitalism and cryptocurrencies." An early appearance by Elon Musk on the Good Time Show was described as the first show that "broke Clubhouse" by rapidly exceeding the limit of 5,000 simultaneous users. The desire to interact with a larger community led to a variety of later innovations to allow streaming and replaying of Clubhouse chats. On that episode, Elon Musk grilled Robinhood CEO Vlad Tenev regarding the GameStop trading controversy. As of December 2021, the show had over 187,000 subscribers, plus 735,000 subscribers between Krishnan and Ramamurthy's personal Clubhouse accounts. Other guests have included Facebook CEO Mark Zuckerberg, Diane von Fürstenberg, Tony Hawk, MrBeast, and A.R. Rahman.

In 2022, the Good Time Show moved to YouTube. It then evolved to a podcasting format under the name The Aarthi and Sriram Show, with both audio and video content. The Hollywood Reporter reported that the podcast had received more than 1 million downloads by early 2023.

== Personal life ==
Krishnan is married to Aarthi Ramamurthy, co-host of The Aarthi and Sriram Show (formerly the Good Time Show) and a serial entrepreneur. They met in college in 2003 through a Yahoo! chat room related to a coding project and began dating in 2006 and eloped in 2010.

== Awards ==
- Time Person of the Year – 2025
