= Aarthi Ramamurthy =

Indian-American entrepreneur

- Born: Chennai, Tamil Nadu, India
- Occupation: Venture capitalist • entrepreneur • software engineer • podcaster • clubhouse host
- Employer(s): Schema Ventures (Founder); VWO / Wingify (Board of Directors)
- Title: Founder of Schema Ventures Former Product Director at Facebook Co-founder of True & Co. Chief Product Officer of Rithum Co-host of The Aarthi and Sriram Show
- Spouse: Sriram Krishnan (m. 2010)
- Website: schemavc.com

Aarthi Ramamurthy is the founder of Schema Ventures, a venture capital firm. She is also known as an Indian-American entrepreneur, talk show host, and internet celebrity. She founded two venture-backed companies, as well as launching the Good Time Show Clubhouse (later, YouTube) chat show with her husband, Sriram Krishnan. She has featured guests including Elon Musk, Mark Zuckerberg, Virgil Abloh, and Steve Ballmer. The show has evolved to a podcasting format under the name The Aarthi and Sriram Show via a deal with iHeartMedia. She is represented by WME. She serves on the board of Wingify, parent company of the web app technology provider VWO.

== Early life and education ==
Ramamurthy was born in Chennai, Tamil Nadu, India, and had a "typical middle-class Indian upbringing."

== Career ==
=== Software engineering ===
In 2005, Ramamurthy was hired by S. Somasegar at Microsoft, moving to the company's Seattle headquarters in 2007. There, she led part of the Xbox Live team. She later worked at Netflix, where she built the consumer SDK. She also worked at Facebook as a software engineer, where she served as Director of Product leading creator monetization products such as Facebook Stars, subscription and tipping products, and later led Facebook Groups and community governance products.

=== Entrepreneurship ===
Ramamurthy co-founded True & Co, a lingerie e-commerce company in 2012. The company provides a "big data" approach to fitting bras based on an interactive questionnaire.

She then served as entrepreneur-in-residence at Battery Ventures.

In 2013, she founded Lumoid, a rental/try-before-you-buy service for gadgets such as camera gear and headphones. The company's goal was to allow consumers to test different brands before committing to a purchase. For example, prior to the Apple Watch's launch, over 3,000 people committed to rent the device through Lumoid. Best Buy partnered with Lumoid to power its gear rental program.

=== Schema Ventures ===
Ramamurthy announced the launch of Schema Ventures at Fortune's Most Powerful Women Summit 2025. She described it as a solo GP venture capital fund, starting with a $20mm first fund focused on early-stage opportunities, particularly on developer tools and back-end infrastructure. Limited partners included Marc Andreessen, Garry Tan, and Y Combinator's fund-of-funds, while publicly disclosed investments included Cosmic Robotics, Confido Health, and Powerhouse.

=== The Good Time Show and podcasts ===
In December 2020, Ramamurthy and her husband, Sriram Krishnan, launched the Good Time Show, which began as a Clubhouse talk show. They describe it as "focuse[d] on organic conversations on anything from startups to venture capitalism and cryptocurrencies." An early appearance by Elon Musk on The Good Time Show was described as the first show that "broke Clubhouse" by rapidly exceeding the limit of 5,000 simultaneous users. The desire to interact with a larger community led to a variety of later innovations to allow streaming and replaying of Clubhouse chats. On that episode, Elon Musk grilled Robinhood CEO Vlad Tenev regarding the GameStop trading controversy. As of July, 2021, the show had over 175,000 subscribers. During Krishnan's interview with Facebook CEO Mark Zuckerberg, Zuckerberg described augmented and virtual reality as the future of work, alluding to the then-unannounced Meta concept. Additional guests have included Tony Hawk, Diane von Furstenberg, Sonam Kapoor Ahuja, Kanye West, and MrBeast.

In 2022, WME signed Ramamurthy and Krishnan for film and TV development projects, as well as other publishing and podcasting ventures.

In 2022, the Good Time Show moved to YouTube. Ramamurthy's departure was cited as a major blow to Clubhouse. It then evolved to a podcasting format under the name The Aarthi and Sriram Show, with both audio and video content. The Hollywood Reporter reported that the podcast had received more than 1 million downloads by early 2023.

=== Other roles ===
In 2021, Ramamurthy joined Clubhouse as Head of International, launching 30 languages, creator programs in India and Brazil, and the first Indian app icon.

In 2023, Ramamurthy was named the Chief Product Officer of CommerceHub, later renamed Rithum.

She serves on the Board of Directors of VWO/Wingify.

=== Investing and other activities ===
Ramamurthy has made early-stage investments in technology and growth companies. She has spoken on panels about diversity in technology and product leadership.

== Personal life ==
Ramamurthy is married to Sriram Krishnan, a venture capitalist and co-host of The Good Time Show. They met in college in 2003 through a Yahoo! chat room related to a coding project and began dating in 2006 and eloped in 2010.
