= Daniel M. Gallagher =

American lawyer

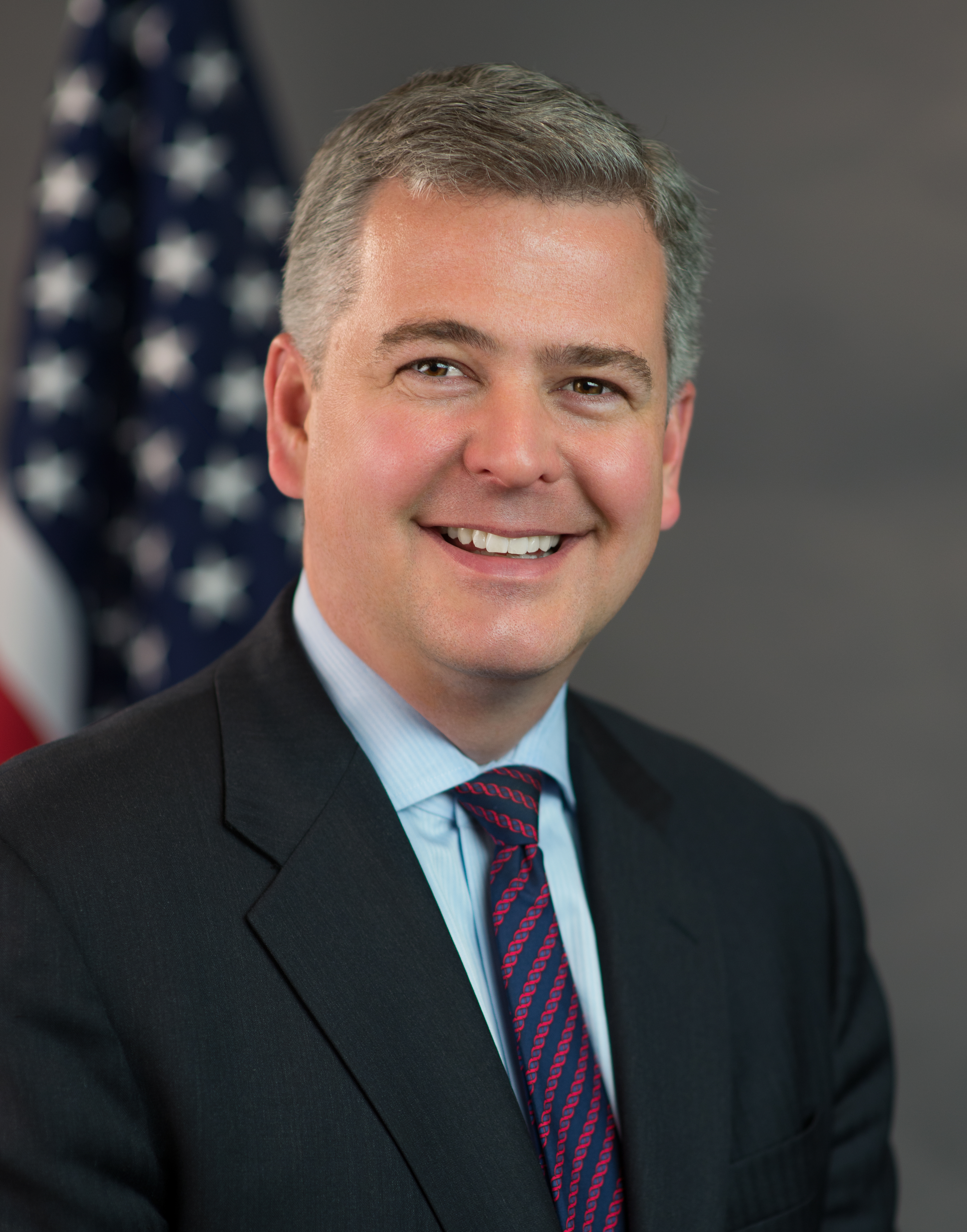

Commissioner of the United States Securities and Exchange Commission
- In office November 7, 2011 – October 2, 2015
- President: Barack Obama
- Chairwoman: Mary Schapiro; Mary Jo White
- Preceded by: Kathleen L. Casey
- Succeeded by: Jay Clayton

Personal details
- Born: May 31, 1972 (age 54)
- Party: Republican
- Education: Georgetown University (BA); Catholic University of America (JD)
- Profession: Lawyer

Daniel M. Gallagher, Jr. (born May 31, 1972) is an American lawyer who is the Chief Legal, Compliance and Corporate Affairs Officer at Robinhood. He served as a Commissioner of the U.S. Securities and Exchange Commission (SEC) from 2011 to 2015, having initially joined the SEC as counsel to its commissioner in 2006. He also previously served as the deputy director and co-acting director of the Division of Trading and Markets.

== Education ==
Gallagher graduated from Georgetown University in 1994 with a Bachelor of Arts in English and went on to receive a Juris Doctor, magna cum laude, from the Columbus School of Law at the Catholic University of America in 1998, where he was also a member of the law school's law review.

== Career ==
Gallagher began his career in the private sector when he joined Wilmer, Cutler Pickering Hale and Dorr LLP, also known as WilmerHale, as an associate in the firm's Securities Department. His next position took him to Fiserv Securities Inc. to serve as the company's senior vice president and general counsel.

=== Securities and Exchange Commission ===
In 2006, Gallagher transitioned to the government sector and joined the SEC as counsel to former SEC Commissioner Paul S. Atkins and later as counsel to former Chairman Christopher Cox, working on matters involving the Division of Enforcement and the Division of Trading and Markets. In 2008, he became the deputy director of the Division of Trading and Markets and served as Division co-acting director from April 2009 through January 2010. In 2010, Gallagher returned to WilmerHale as a partner in both the Broker-Dealer Compliance and Regulation Practice Group and the Securities Litigation and Enforcement Practice Group.

Gallagher served as an SEC Commissioner from November 2011 to October 2015. During his tenure, he urged the SEC to conduct expansive reviews of equity and fixed-income market structure. Gallagher would comment on this, stating that ”the last time the Commission undertook a formal, thorough evaluation of the equity markets, the result was the January 1994 Market 2000 Report. … Smart regulation involves taking the time to understand how things became the way they are, and, critically, better defining and articulating the goals of regulations.” He was outspoken on multiple issues, particularly on the 2010 Dodd-Frank financial law, which Gallagher criticized for mandating nearly 100 rules, where a majority he felt were unrelated to the financial crisis. Through his tenure, Gallagher voted “no” on 16 rulemakings, stating that it was “the hollowest of achievements”. He would go on to qualify that the votes represented “16 proposals or final rules that I could not in good conscience approve, because they do not stay true to our mission”.

=== Post-SEC, private sector ===
After his time with the SEC, Gallagher returned to the private sector and in 2016 became president of Patomak Global Partners, a financial services consulting firm. In 2017, he joined global pharmaceutical company Mylan N.V. as the chief legal officer.

Gallagher rejoined WilmerHale in September 2019 where he served as partner and deputy chair of the firm's Securities Department. His practice focused on advising corporate boards and management on the full range of legal and strategic issues they faced, and counseling financial services and accounting firms in investigations, regulatory proceedings and policy matters.

In May 2020, Robinhood announced that Gallagher would be joining the company as Chief Legal Officer.

In November 2024, it was reported that officials in the Trump administration had considered Gallagher for nomination to rejoin the SEC, assuming the chairperson role. He was seen as the frontrunner for the position. Gallagher would withdraw himself from consideration, commenting: “It is always an honor to have your name in the mix for an incredibly important job like SEC Chairman. However, I have made it clear that I do not wish to be considered for this position”.

== Professional affiliations ==
Gallagher serves as a fellow for Columbia Law School’s program in the Law and Economics of Capital Markets. He also serves on the advisory board of the Institute for Law and Economics at the University of Pennsylvania, the Board of Visitors at Catholic University of America’s Columbus School of Law, the Board of Governors for the Financial Industry Regulatory Authority, and is a member of the board of Cowboy Space Corporation.

Gallagher previously served on the board of the National Association of Corporate Directors (NACD), and previously served on Robinhood's Board of Directors before joining the company as its Chief Legal Officer.

He was formerly a non-executive director of the Irish Stock Exchange.

Gallagher also served on the advisory boards of the Center for Corporate Governance, part of the Raj & Kamla Gupta Governance Institute in Drexel University's LeBow College of Business, and the New Civil Liberties Alliance.
