= True & Co. =

American online lingerie retailer

- Industry: Internet, online retailing
- Founder: Michelle Lam; Aarthi Ramamurthy
- Headquarters: San Francisco, California
- Key people: Michelle Lam (CEO)
- Products: Lingerie
- Parent: Basic Resources, Inc.
- Website: trueandco.com

True & Co. is an American online lingerie startup, headquartered in San Francisco, California.

== History ==
True & Co. was founded by Michelle Lam and initially Aarthi Ramamurthy. After the early departure of Ramamurthy due to infighting, New York based Dan Dolgin was hired and given the title of co-founder. Dolgin has since left the company. A new co-founder was named in 2016, the fourth for True & Co., with operations executive Beatrice Pang given the title. She was formerly with the Microsoft Corporation. Lam founded the company after becoming frustrated with trying on bras in fitting rooms.

In March 2017, True & Co. was acquired by PVH, and was integrated into the Heritage Brands division alongside intimate apparel brands Warner's and Olga, sportswear brand Izod, and dress/casualwear brands Van Heusen, Arrow, and Geoffrey Beene.

In November 2023, PVH sold the brand to Basic Resources, Inc, alongside the Warner's and Olga brands.

== Service ==
The company uses a questionnaire and associated algorithm to recommend bra sizes to customers. According to the New York Times, the company's concept allows customers to "choose what fits best." True & Co. sells bras from other lingerie lines as well as from its own branded collection.

True & Co. released a beta version in January 2012 and officially launched in May 2012. According to Bloomberg Businessweek, "True & Co. is often referred to as 'the Netflix of bras.'" In May 2016, the company launched a "Try-On Truck", a mobile lingerie fitting room which has since ended.
