= Kathleen L. Casey =

American government official (born 1966)

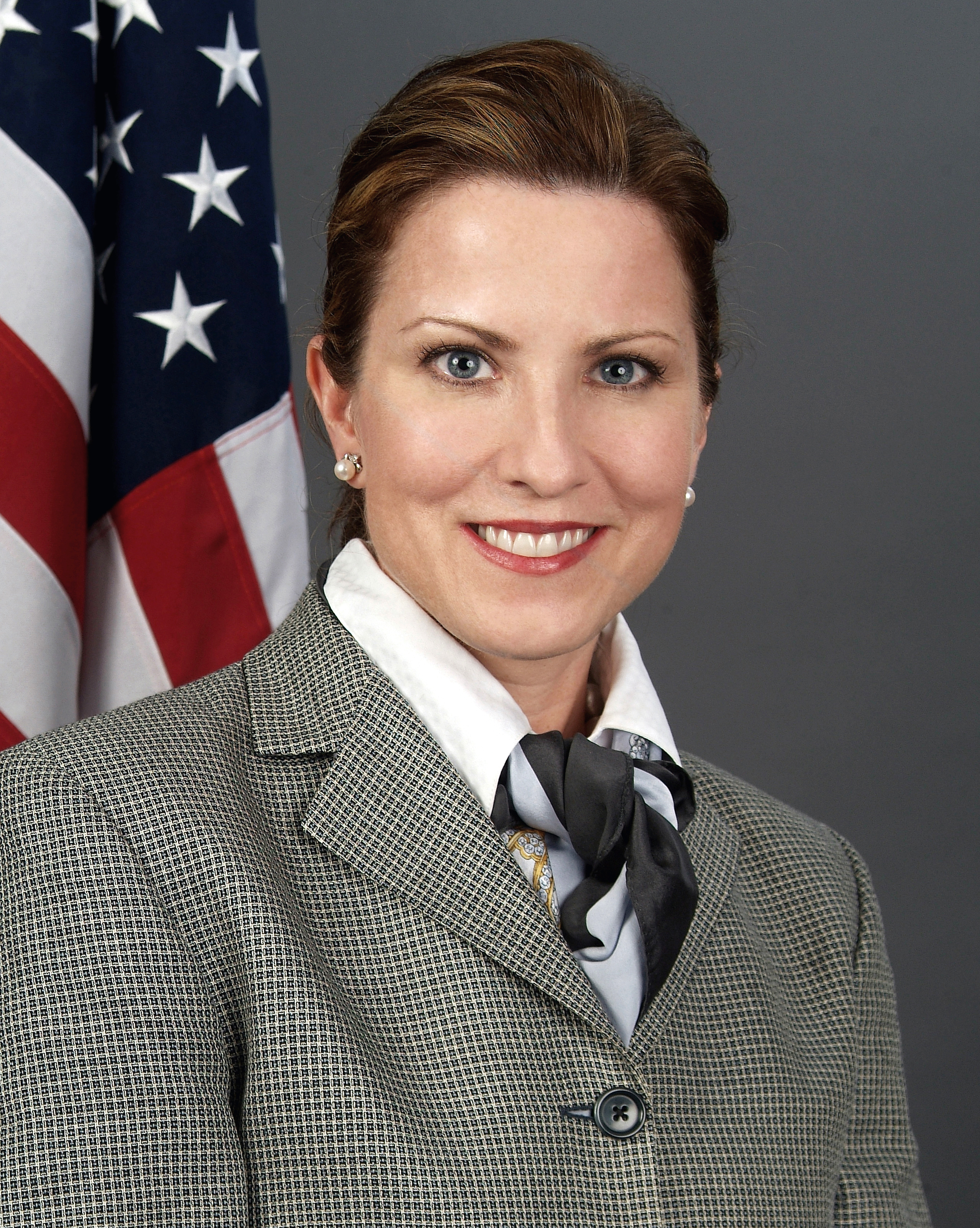

Commissioner of the Securities and Exchange Commission
- In office July 17, 2006 – August 5, 2011
- President: George W. Bush; Barack Obama
- Preceded by: Cynthia Glassman
- Succeeded by: Daniel M. Gallagher

Personal details
- Born: April 12, 1966 (age 60) US military base, Tripoli, Libya
- Party: Republican
- Education: Pennsylvania State University (BA); George Mason University School of Law (JD)
- Profession: Lawyer

Kathleen L. Casey (born April 12, 1966) is a former Republican commissioner of the U.S. Securities and Exchange Commission. She was appointed by President George W. Bush and sworn in on July 17, 2006. Her term expired in August 2011.

== Background ==
Prior to being appointed commissioner, Casey spent 13 years on Capitol Hill. Before her appointment as commissioner, she served as staff director and counsel of the United States Senate Committee on Banking, Housing, and Urban Affairs. Casey was primarily responsible for guiding the chairman's and committee's consideration of, and action on, issues affecting economic and monetary policy, international trade and finance, banking, securities and insurance regulation, transit and housing policy, money laundering and terror finance. Significant issues the committee considered under Ms. Casey's direction include: reform of Government Sponsored Enterprises, reauthorization of the Terrorism Risk Insurance Act, Deposit Insurance Reform, insurance regulation, Committee on Foreign Investment in the United States, Sarbanes-Oxley implementation, and credit rating agencies.

Casey served as legislative director and chief of staff for U.S. Senator Richard Shelby (R-AL). As legislative director from 1996 to 2002, Casey was instrumental in the drafting and passage of several laws. She developed, managed, and coordinated all aspects of legislative operations with a key focus on the appropriations process. In her capacity as Chief of Staff from 2002 to 2003, Casey acted as a key advisor on all policy and political matters.

From 1994 to 1996, Casey served as staff director of the Subcommittee on Financial Institutions and Regulatory Relief of the Senate Banking Committee. She was responsible for advising and staffing the Senator on all committee issues, including the Private Securities Litigation Reform Act, Whitewater special investigation, and financial services regulatory relief legislation. Casey also served Senator Shelby as legislative assistant from 1993 to 1994, during which she was responsible for handling all tax, budget, and finance policy matters.

Casey voted to prevent the SEC from taking enforcement action against Goldman Sachs.

In May 2013, the Pennsylvania State Senate approved her nomination to the Penn State University Board of Trustees.

In March 2014, Casey was appointed to the board of directors of HSBC serving as a member of the Group Audit Committee and the Financial System Vulnerabilities Committee.

== Education ==
Casey was born on a military base in Tripoli, Libya. She received a J.D. from George Mason University School of Law in 1993 and a B.A. in International Politics from Pennsylvania State University in 1988.
