= KBRH =

- Baton Rouge, Louisiana; United States
- Broadcast area: Greater Baton Rouge
- Frequency: 1260 kHz

Programming
- Format: Rhythm and blues

Ownership
- Owner: East Baton Rouge Parish School System; (East Baton Rouge Parish School Board)
- Sister stations: WBRH

History
- First air date: February 16, 1953
- Former call signs: WXOK (1953–1966); WAIL (1966–1979); WTKL (1979–1993)
- Call sign meaning: Baton Rouge High

Technical information
- Licensing authority: FCC
- Facility ID: 18184
- Class: D
- Power: 5,000 watts (day); 127 watts (night)
- HAAT: 62.3 m (204 ft)
- Transmitter coordinates: 30°27′38″N 91°14′37″W

Links
- Public license information: Public file; LMS
- Webcast: Listen live
- Website: www.wbrh.org

KBRH (1260 AM) is a radio station broadcasting a classic rhythm and blues format in Baton Rouge, Louisiana, United States. The station is owned by the East Baton Rouge Parish School Board and run by students at Baton Rouge Magnet High School alongside WBRH (90.3 FM).

Baton Rouge High has owned and operated this station since 1993, when it returned to the air after a silence of several years and the killing of its owner, who had been working to put it back into service following a bankruptcy. It had originally been established as WXOK in 1953; it became WAIL in 1966, as part of a frequency trade that moved WXOK to its present location at 1460 kHz, and WTKL in 1979.

== History ==
=== WXOK ===
On November 6, 1951, Jules J. Paglin and Stanley W. Ray, Jr., a partnership doing business as the Capital City Broadcasting Company, applied to the Federal Communications Commission (FCC) for authority to construct a new, daytime-only radio station on 1260 kHz in Baton Rouge. Paglin and Ray were already in business as the owners of WBOK in New Orleans. They hoped for the call sign WAOK, to match WBOK and new acquisition KAOK in Lake Charles.

The FCC granted a construction permit on September 18, 1952, and the station began broadcasting as WXOK on February 16, 1953; studios were at Third and Convention streets, while the transmitter was located 4 mi (6.4 km) west of Port Allen. The station, like the other Paglin-Ray outlets, adopted a music-intensive format with a heavy focus on country and Black music. With the award of the Baton Rouge station, Paglin and Ray began branding their station chain as the OK Group.

=== WAIL on 1260 ===
In 1965, radio stations WXOK and WAIL (1460 AM) agreed to a trade of facilities, equipment, and studios. The trade consisted of parallel acquisitions in which the OK Group purchased the 1460 physical plant—which could broadcast at night—for $650,000, while WAIL—owned by Ralph L. Burge of Merchants Broadcasters—purchased the 1260 facilities for $113,000. The exchange took effect January 11, 1966, at which time WXOK's programming moved to 1460. Later that year, studios moved to the Republic Tower.

Burge, who also hosted mornings on the station as "Breakfast with Burge" until late 1973, died on May 24, 1974; he had been the only owner of WAIL since its establishment on 1460 kHz in 1957.

=== WTKL ===
Angie Burge, Ralph's widow, sold WAIL in late 1978 to majority owner Victor Brown, a New Orleans physician, and Louis Bathen of Baton Rouge, together doing business as Venture Broadcasting. When the deal took effect in February 1979, the station was retooled as WTKL "Tickle" with a "contemporary beautiful music" format promising "no Bach, no rock", but everything in between.

The station continued to operate with much the same format and ownership for several years, but its finances began to decline in the late 1980s. In July 1986, WTKL filed for Chapter 11 bankruptcy, reverting from urban contemporary music to a similar easy listening mix. A sale to another party was floated but never came to fruition. As part of a 1987 reorganization plan, Leader Group, a company owned by Bathen, offered to buy the station for $500,000. It took over management of the station on behalf of a court-appointed trustee, but Leader was never able to put together financing to carry out the purchase. In 1989, the case was converted to Chapter 7 liquidation at the motion of the Internal Revenue Service; the station had more than $627,000 in debts versus $25,000 in assets. In 1990, the sale to Leader was completed; the firm paid $10,000 as well as agreements to pay $134,000 in debt owed to Premier Bank, Angie Burge (who leased the studio and transmitter), and Satellite Music Network, which provided its music programming; by this time, it was also operating on a 24-hour basis.

Between 1990 and 1992, WTKL went off the air, but by early 1992, Bathen was leading efforts to return it to service; new studios were being set up on Ted Dunham Avenue. On the night of April 30, 1992, Bathen's mother noted that he did not return home after making a night deposit at a bank. The next day, she and a friend of Bathen's entered the building to find him dead and lying on the floor, having suffered multiple stab wounds. A 21-year-old man was arrested and indicted in the case, which proceeded to trial. It emerged that Bathen had met the man at a Baton Rouge gay bar; the two were seen together several times in April 1992. The two men went back to the station office—which was without electricity—to pick up paperwork; according to his defense attorney, after using the bathroom, he encountered Bathen, who pressured him into unconsensual anal sex; his attorney argued that the killing—in which Bathen was stabbed 32 times—was in self-defense. After one hour of deliberations, the jury acquitted the man.

=== KBRH ===
Bathen's death left the silent station in legal limbo, as he was the sole officer of the licensee; Bathen's mother, his only heir, died soon after. The FCC rejected a filing made by Richard Preis, the other shareholder in Leader Group, to keep the station silent because he was not an officer of the licensee. A district court appointed a temporary receiver in March 1993 in order to preserve the station's assets. Preis then donated the equipment to his alma mater, Baton Rouge High School, and Premier Bank wrote off $750,000 in loan debt to permit the high school to take possession of the property; this made the school reputedly the only one in the world with AM and FM stations, as it already owned WBRH (90.3 FM).

Later in 1993, the newly renamed KBRH began broadcasting under Baton Rouge High School ownership and with students performing staff duties. Its format initially consisted of a talk format dominated by nationally syndicated talk shows. This was dropped in 1995 to air classic R&B music. Power was increased from 1,000 to 5,000 watts in 1999. WBRH and KBRH began streaming in 2016.
