= Lunchclub =

American social media company

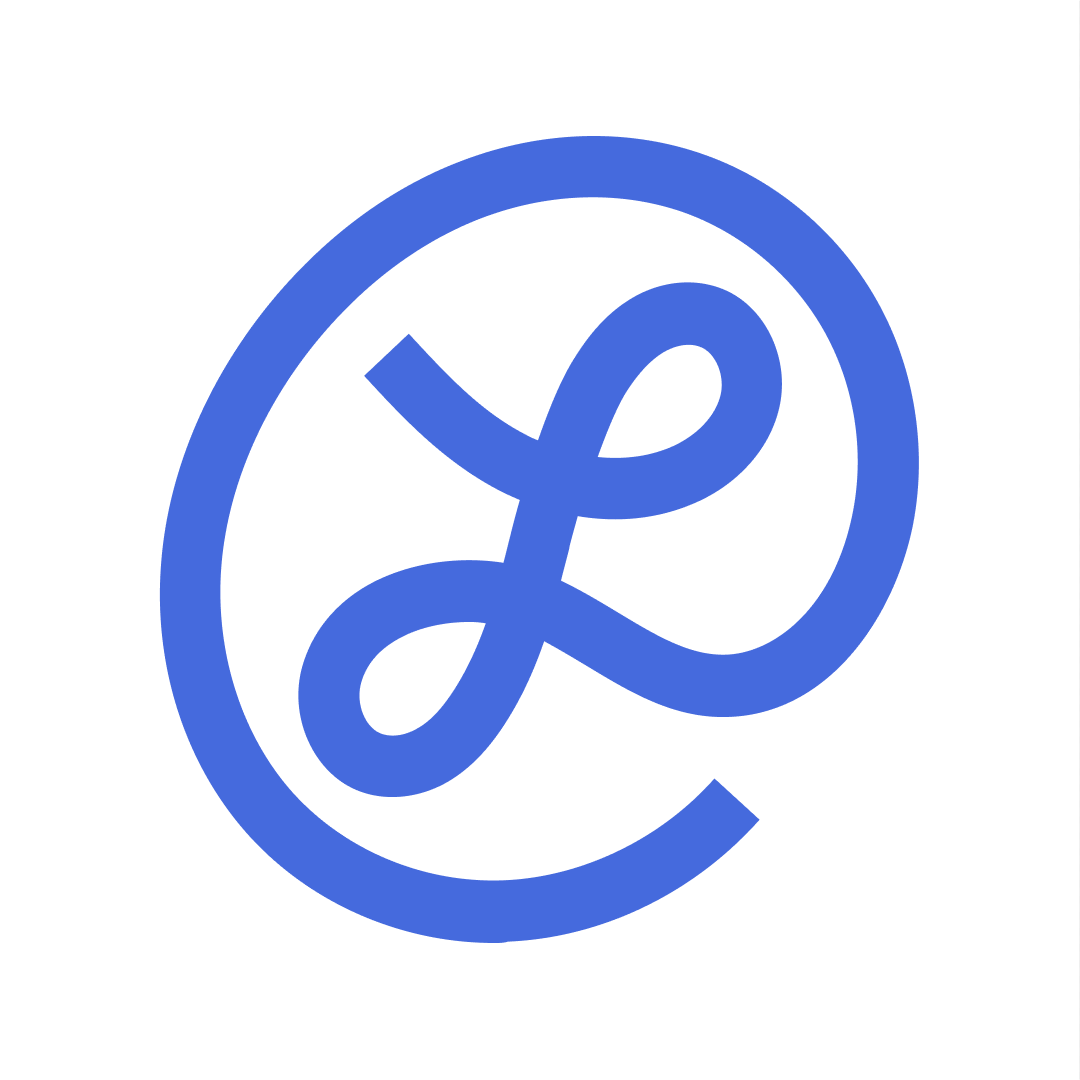
- Founded: November 2017
- Founder: Vladimir Novakovski; Scott Wu; Hayley Leibson
- Area served: Worldwide
- Key people: Vladimir Novakovski (CEO)
- Website: www.lunchclub.com

Lunchclub is an American social platform that uses artificial intelligence and machine learning to connect users with common interests and objectives. Lunchclub operates remote-first, and lacks an official physical headquarters. The platform is accessible through a mobile app or a web browser.

== History ==
Lunchclub was established in November 2017. The parent company of Lunchclub is Elliot Technologies, Inc. The platform started its services in cities across the United States and United Kingdom and, as of 2021, it is available worldwide.

Lunchclub received $4 million in a seed funding round from a16z to connect professionals offline. In 2020, Lunchclub raised a $24 million series A round led by Coatue and Lightspeed Venture Partners. After the series A funding, the company's estimated valuation is above $100 million. Investors including Michael Ovitz, Max Levchin, Adam D’Angelo, Vlad Tenev, and Ruchi Sanghvi have also helped fund the company.

In March 2020, in response to the COVID-19 pandemic, Lunchclub added video chat to the platform, using the same technology.

== Features ==
Lunchclub uses artificial intelligence and machine learning to connect people that share similar interests, values, and goals. The user defines their interests including career, funding, partnerships, new business ideas, and more. Then, its machine learning and AI process create profiles from user information and their public data sources. They then match people up, using this data, based on their interests and objectives.
