= Scott Wu =

American computer programmer and entrepreneur

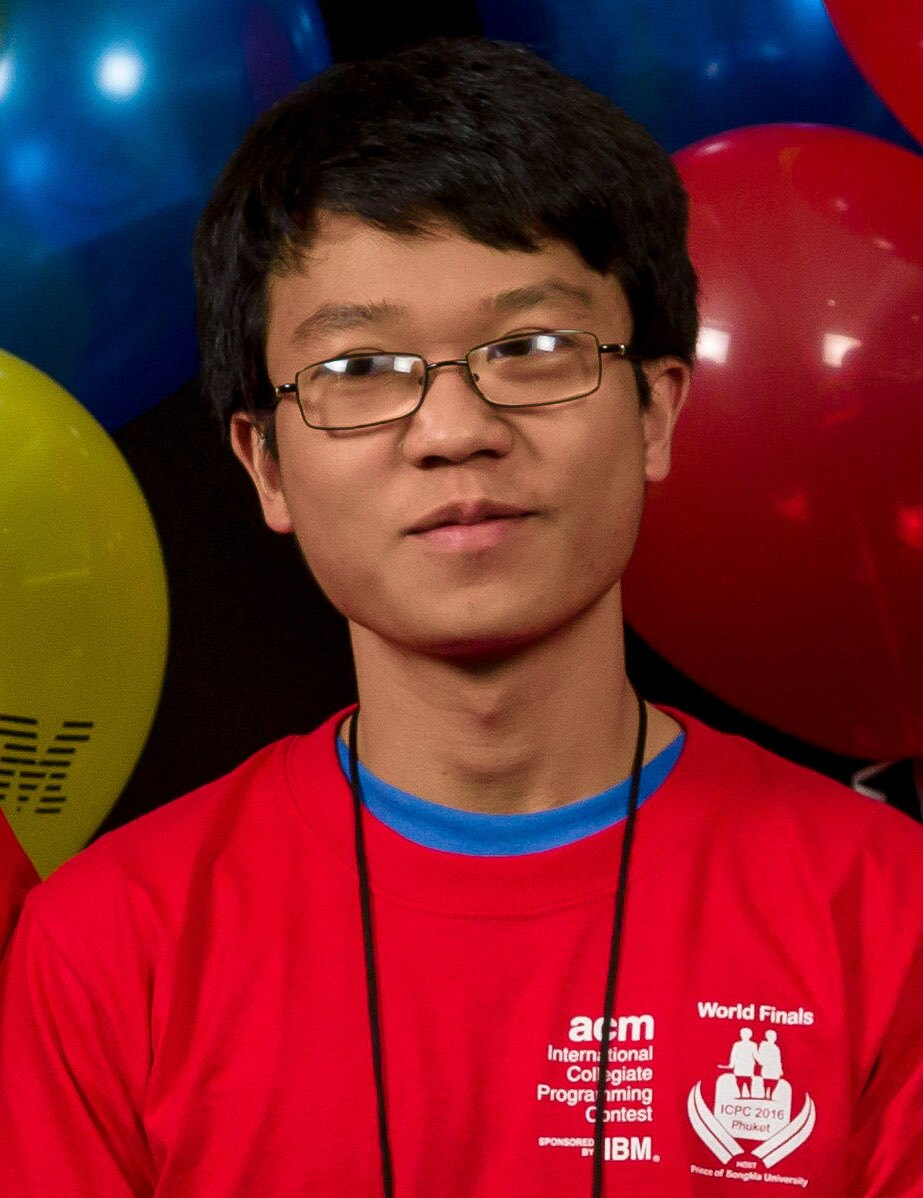
- Wu at the 2016 ACM-ICPC World Finals
- Born: 1997 (age 28–29); Louisiana, U.S.
- Other name: scott_wu
- Education: Harvard University
- Known for: Co-founding Cognition AI and Lunchclub; Achievements in competitive programming
- Awards: Codeforces peak rating: 3350

Scott Wu (born October 1996) is an American entrepreneur. He is the co-founder of Cognition AI and Lunchclub. Wu is also a competitive programmer who won three gold medals (placing first in 2014) at the International Olympiad in Informatics (IOI) and took third place in the 2021 Google Code Jam.

== Early life and education ==
Wu was born in 1997 in Louisiana to a Chinese immigrant family. He attended Baton Rouge Magnet High School. Growing up, he competed in competitions related to programming and mathematics, and won three gold medals (placing first in 2014) at the International Olympiad in Informatics. He also competed in Mathcounts and became individual champion in 2011.

After high school, Wu attended Harvard University for two years before dropping out. As an undergraduate at Harvard College, he was part of the team representing it in the 2016 International Collegiate Programming Contest (ICPC) which won a gold medal and came third place overall.

== Career ==
From 2014 to 2015, Wu worked as software engineer at Addepar.

In 2017, Wu co-founded Lunchclub and was its CTO until 2022 when he left to pursue different interests. Wu was listed in 2020 edition of Forbes 30 Under 30 for co-founding Lunchclub.

In 2021, Wu came third place in the 2021 Google Code Jam.

In 2023, Wu co-founded Cognition AI which developed Devin AI. It raised $21 million in funding from Peter Thiel's Founders Fund. His wealth is estimated to be between $600 million and $1.6 billion, the latter being per Bloomberg.

== Achievements ==
=== Competitive programming ===
A more comprehensive list of achievements can be found at the Competitive Programming Hall Of Fame website.

- International Olympiad in Informatics: 3 Gold (2012, 2013 and 2014) (First place overall in 2014)
- International Collegiate Programming Contest (Representing Harvard): 1 Gold (2016) (Third place overall)
- Google Code Jam: Third place (2021)
- Topcoder Open Algorithm: Third place (2017)
- Codeforces: Legendary Grandmaster (peak rating 3350)

=== Mathematics ===
- HMMT: Champion (2014)
- Mathcounts (Representing Louisiana): Individual champion (2011)

== Family ==
Wu has an older brother, Neal. Like Scott, Neal has a competitive programming background. He graduated from Harvard University in 2014. His competitive programming achievements include three gold medals at the IOI, a team silver medal at the ICPC, and second place at the 2012 Google Code Jam. The brothers work together at Cognition AI. He previously worked at Facebook and Google.
