= WBRH =

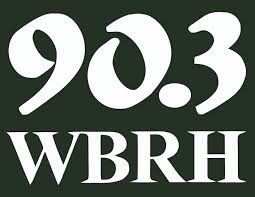
- Baton Rouge, Louisiana; United States
- Broadcast area: Greater Baton Rouge
- Frequency: 90.3 MHz
- Branding: WBRH 90.3 FM; Jazz From the Capital City

Programming
- Format: Jazz
- Affiliations: National Public Radio

Ownership
- Owner: East Baton Rouge Parish Public School System; (East Baton Rouge Parish School Board)
- Sister stations: KBRH

History
- First air date: September 8, 1977
- Call sign meaning: Baton Rouge High

Technical information
- Licensing authority: FCC
- Facility ID: 18185
- Class: C3
- ERP: 3,500 watts
- HAAT: 145.6 meters (478 ft)
- Transmitter coordinates: 30°26′42.00″N 91°9′33.00″W

Links
- Public license information: Public file; LMS
- Webcast: Listen Live
- Website: www.wbrh.org

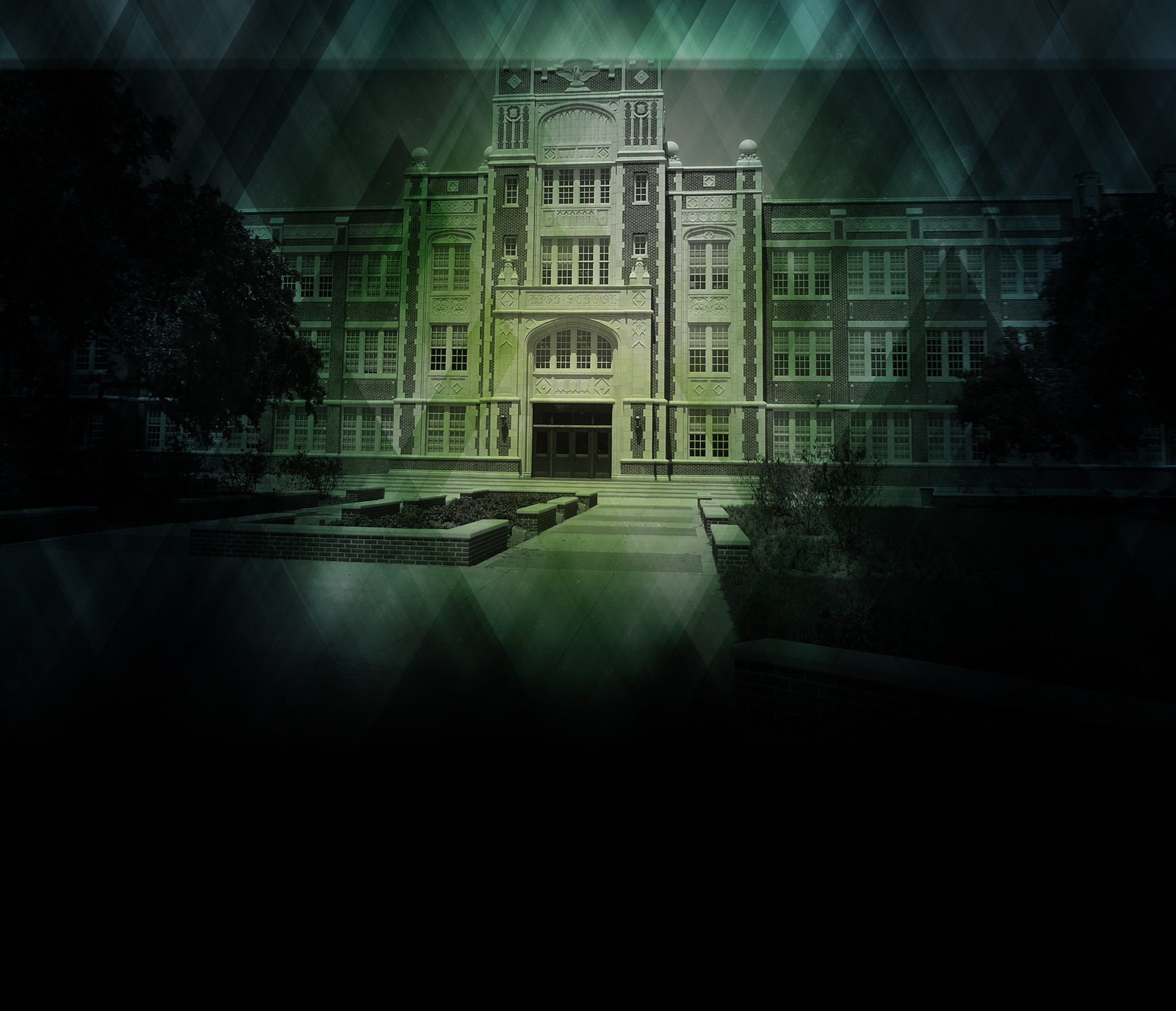
Front of Baton Rouge High School

WBRH (90.3 FM) is a student-run jazz high school radio station in Baton Rouge, Louisiana. The station, at Baton Rouge Magnet High School, broadcasts with an effective radiated power (ERP) of 21 kW. It is owned by the East Baton Rouge Parish School Board, along with sister station KBRH (1260 AM). WBRH and KBRH are the only high school radio stations in the country operating 24 hours per day year-round.

== Station history ==
WBRH went on the air on September 8, 1977, at 90.1 MHz with 20 watts ERP as a launching pad for future broadcasters. It currently plays jazz for Baton Rouge.

== See also ==
- List of jazz radio stations in the United States
