= Baiju Bhatt =

American entrepreneur

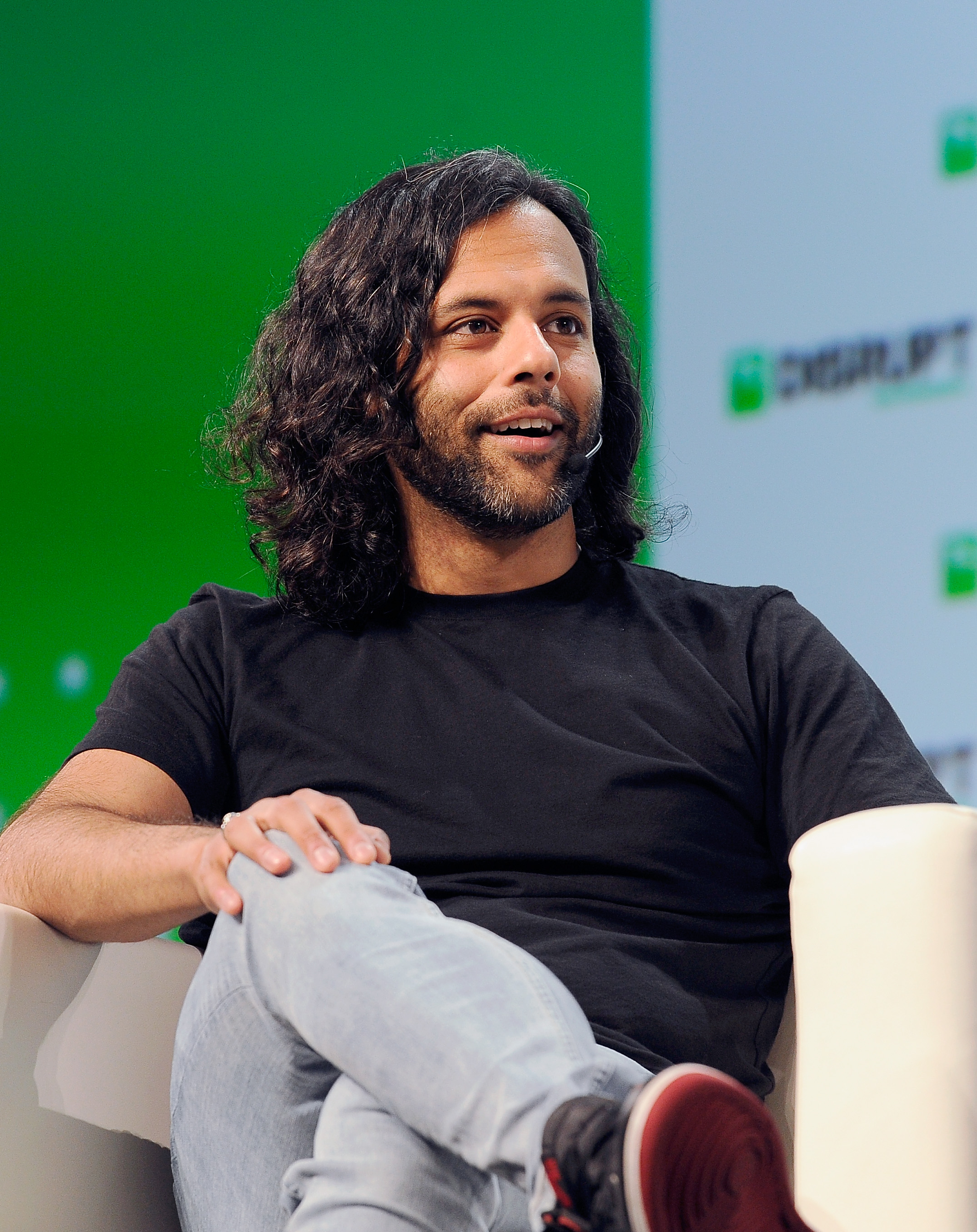
- Bhatt in 2018
- Born: Baiju Prafulkumar Bhatt; 1984 or 1985 (age 41–42)
- Education: Stanford University
- Occupation: Entrepreneur
- Known for: Co-founder and co-chief executive officer, Robinhood
- Spouse: Adrienne Sussman
- Children: 1

Baiju Prafulkumar Bhatt (born 1984/1985) is an American billionaire entrepreneur. He is the founder of Cowboy Space Corporation and the co-founder and former co-chief executive officer of Robinhood, a US-based financial services company.

== Early life and education ==
Bhatt, the son of Gujarati immigrants from India, grew up in Poquoson, Virginia. His father worked at NASA's Langley Research Center, sparking an interest in space during Bhatt's youth. He earned a bachelor's degree in physics from Stanford University, where he also completed a master's degree in mathematics in 2008. Bhatt and Vlad Tenev, the other co-founder of Robinhood, met during their time at Stanford.

== Career ==
=== Robinhood ===
In 2013, Bhatt co-founded the zero-commission stock trading platform Robinhood with Vlad Tenev. In 2015, Robinhood launched a mobile app, of which Bhatt focused on the product and design elements. Bhatt emphasized the importance of user research and he and team members would approach students on Stanford's campus, asking for feedback on new features, eventually leading to an Apple Design award in that same year.

Following a funding round in May 2018 which increased Robinhood's valuation to $6 billion, Bhatt and Tenev became billionaires. He stepped down as co-CEO in November 2020 and assumed the role of chief creative officer.

In March 2024, Bhatt stepped down from his executive role of chief creative officer at Robinhood with the intent to focus on another venture. He retained his role as a member of the company's board of directors.

=== Cowboy Space Corporation ===
In October 2024, Bhatt announced the launch of a space-based solar energy startup based in San Carlos called Aetherflux, of which he is the founder and chief executive. The company intends to create a satellite constellation to collect solar energy in space and beam it back to Earth using infrared lasers, distributing energy to remote regions of the world where delivering power is expensive, difficult, or dangerous. Space-based solar power can be traced back to science fiction writer Isaac Asimov’s 1941 short story, Reason, while the name of the company was inspired by the idea of aether theories. Bhatt is an investor in several private space companies, including Reflect Orbital, a company with the goal of building mirrors in space to reflect sunlight toward solar farms on Earth during the night, and Apex, a producer of satellite buses, among others.

In May 2026, Aetherflux rebranded to Cowboy Space Corporation.

== Awards and recognition ==
Bhatt has received recognition from several groups and media outlets. He appeared in a Fast Company list, "Most Creative People", in 2017, and a Fortune "40 Under 40" list in 2018.

== Personal life ==
Bhatt is married to Adrienne Sussman. They have one child. As of December 2024, Forbes has estimated his net worth at US$2.5 billion.

== In popular culture ==
Bhatt is portrayed by Rushi Kota in the 2023 film Dumb Money, a drama about the GameStop short squeeze.
