= Ken Phares =

American football player (born 1951)

No. 36
- Position: Defensive back

Personal information
- Born: April 13, 1951 (age 75); Baton Rouge, Louisiana, U.S.
- Listed height: 6 ft 1 in (1.85 m)
- Listed weight: 190 lb (86 kg)

Career information
- High school: Baton Rouge (Baton Rouge, Louisiana)
- College: Mississippi State (1969–1972)
- NFL draft: 1973: 2nd round, 50th overall pick

Career history
- Pittsburgh Steelers (1973)*
- * Offseason or practice squad member only

Awards and highlights
- First-team All-SEC

Kenneth Jones Phares (born April 13, 1951) is an American former professional football defensive back for the Pittsburgh Steelers of the National Football League. Phares played College football for the Mississippi State Bulldogs, and was selected in the second round of the 1973 NFL draft by the Pittsburgh Steelers.

Ken Phares holds the record for the longest punt return in Mississippi State history with a 90-yard punt return against Lamar University in 1971. Phares was awarded with All-SEC honors in 1972 alongside his teammate, Frank Dowsing Jr. Phares was plagued by knee injuries through his college career, suffering an aggravated knee injury in the 1973 Blue-Gray bowl, where Phares intercepted two passes, returning one for a touchdown. This injury forced him to miss the 1973 Senior Bowl. Prior to the 1973 draft, Phares was weighing between playing professional football and attending the University of Mississippi medical school, stating that "If a team makes me a good offer then I will definitely consider playing pro football, but if no team makes me an acceptable offer then medical school will get priority."

After being drafted, Phares expressed surprise, stating "I was rather surprised I was picked as high in the draft as I was." Phares never played for the Steelers, suffering a career ending knee injury on the first day of training camp.
