= Princeton University Mathematics Competition =

Mathematics competition

The Princeton University Mathematics Competition, also known as PUMaC, is an annual high school mathematics competition started in 2006. The competition typically takes place in January each year, organized entirely by the students of the Princeton University Math Club with hundreds of students participating from across the United States.

For 19 years, the competition was only held at Princeton University, attracting high school students and high school math teams from all across the country who prepared for PUMaC and other similar competitions throughout the year. In 2026, PUMaC organizers partnered with Beijing's ASEEDER to hold the competition in China for the first time. Kenya's Learning Sprouts organization will also partner with Princeton to hold the first African PUMaC in Nairobi, Kenya in 2027.

== Tournament format ==
The competition has two divisions: Division A and Division B. Division A is intended for teams with more competition experience while Division B is designed for teams that are more new to competition. Both divisions are the same structurally.

Teams and individuals both are able to apply to participate within the competition. A full team consists of 8 individuals.

The table below shows the layout for the tournament.

Round	Format
Individual Round	Each individual round participant will take two Individual Tests out of a selection of 4 categories: Algebra, Geometry, Combinatorics, and Number Theory. Each individual test is 50 minutes.
Individual Final	The top 10 students in each division qualify for the Individual Final, a series of 3 difficult proof questions. The contestants are given 90 minutes for the 3 problems.
Team Round	Teams work together to solve 15 problems with 1 bonus question. Teams are given a varying amount of time yearly, typically ranging between 30 and 60 minutes.
Power Round	Teams work together on a variety of proof-style theorems and conjectures. Problems are usually released a week beforehand and teams are allotted that time to work. Proofs are due the date of the competition.

== Scoring and winners ==
The competition is scored by a specific system available here.

	Individuals			Teams (overall)		
Year	Subject	Division A	Division B	#	Division A	Division B
2025	Algebra	Liam Reddy	Eden He	1st	Lehigh Valley Fire	PHS Avocado
2025	Geometry	Nathan Lu	Liran Zhou	2nd	Washington Gold	PRISMS Young Falcons
2025	Number Theory	Alexander Wang	Arjun Pandey	3rd	Texas Ramanujan	Jericho A
2025	Combinatorics	Shaohuan (Nick) Zhang	Brandon Ni	4th	Mad Hatter	Gunn Math
2025	Overall	Liam Reddy	Eric Dai	5th	Florida Alligators	Greater Boston
2024	Algebra	Zongshu Wu	Qiao Zhang	1st	Lehigh Valley Fire	Ward Melville Math Team
2024	Geometry	Jason Mao	Jason Lian	2nd	TJ A	Sierra Canyon School
2024	Number Theory	Alexander Wang	Harry Gao	3rd	Lexington Alpha	Jericho A
2024	Combinatorics	Edward Li	Qiao Zhang	4th	Texas Ramanujan	Theta Math Club
2024	Overall	Alexander Wang	Qiao Zhang	5th	Washington Gold	Big L

== Expansion ==
=== Beijing ===
PUMaC partnered with China's ASEEDER competition organization to hold China's first PUMaC on January 10-11, 2026. The scores for the Chinese competition were held separate from the scores within the US.

=== Kenya ===
Through a partnership with Kenya's Learning Sprouts, an African education-focused organization, PUMaC is set to organize its first competition in Nairobi for 2027, accessible to students across the entire continent.
