= Cognition AI =

American AI company

Cognition AI, Inc.
- Type: Private
- Industry: Information technology
- Founded: November 2023; 2 years ago
- Founders: Scott Wu; Steven Hao; Walden Yan
- Headquarters: San Francisco, California, United States
- Key people: Scott Wu (CEO); Steven Hao (CTO); Walden Yan (CPO)
- Products: Devin AI; DeepWiki; Devin Desktop
- Number of employees: 200 (2026)
- Website: cognition.ai

Cognition AI, Inc. (also known as Cognition Labs), doing business as Cognition, is an American artificial intelligence (AI) company headquartered in San Francisco, California. The company developed Devin AI, an AI software developer.

== History ==
Cognition was founded in August 2023 by Scott Wu, Steven Hao, and Walden Yan. All three were competitive programmers who won gold medals at the International Olympiad in Informatics (IOI).

In March 2024, Cognition released a demo of its AI coding tool, Devin AI, which was said to be able to perform the tasks of a software engineer.

Cognition boasted that its 10-person team as of March 2024 has won a total of 10 IOI gold medals. Apart from its founders, other members of the team who are gold medalists include Wu's brother Neal, Gennady Korotkevich and Andrew He. Wu stated this background gives Cognition an edge in AI competition as teaching an AI to be a programmer is a very deep algorithmic problem that requires the system to make complex decisions.

The company was backed by Peter Thiel's Founders Fund which provided $21 million in early 2024, valuing the company at $350 million. In April 2024, Founders Fund led a $175 million investment into Cognition valuing the company at $2 billion making it a unicorn.

In March 2025, Cognition reached a valuation of $4 billion after a new funding round led by Joe Lonsdale's 8VC.

In July 2025, Cognition signed a definitive agreement to acquire Windsurf, an agentic IDE, after the fallout from Google's $2.4 billion acquihire of their CEO and other senior employees.

After the acquisition, Cognition was valued at $10 billion in September 2025 and by May 2026, it was valued at $26 billion. Bloomberg reported in August 2026 that Cognition has entered early discussions with investors for new financing at a valuation of at least $40 billion. In June 2026, Cognition announced rebranding of Windsurf to Devin Desktop.

In September 2026, Cognition engineer Eric Lu announced the factorization of RSA-260, the largest RSA challenge number publicly factored, using a GPU implementation developed and operated with Devin.

== See also ==
- List of AI-assisted software development tools
- List of artificial intelligence companies
