= Princeton International School of Mathematics and Science =

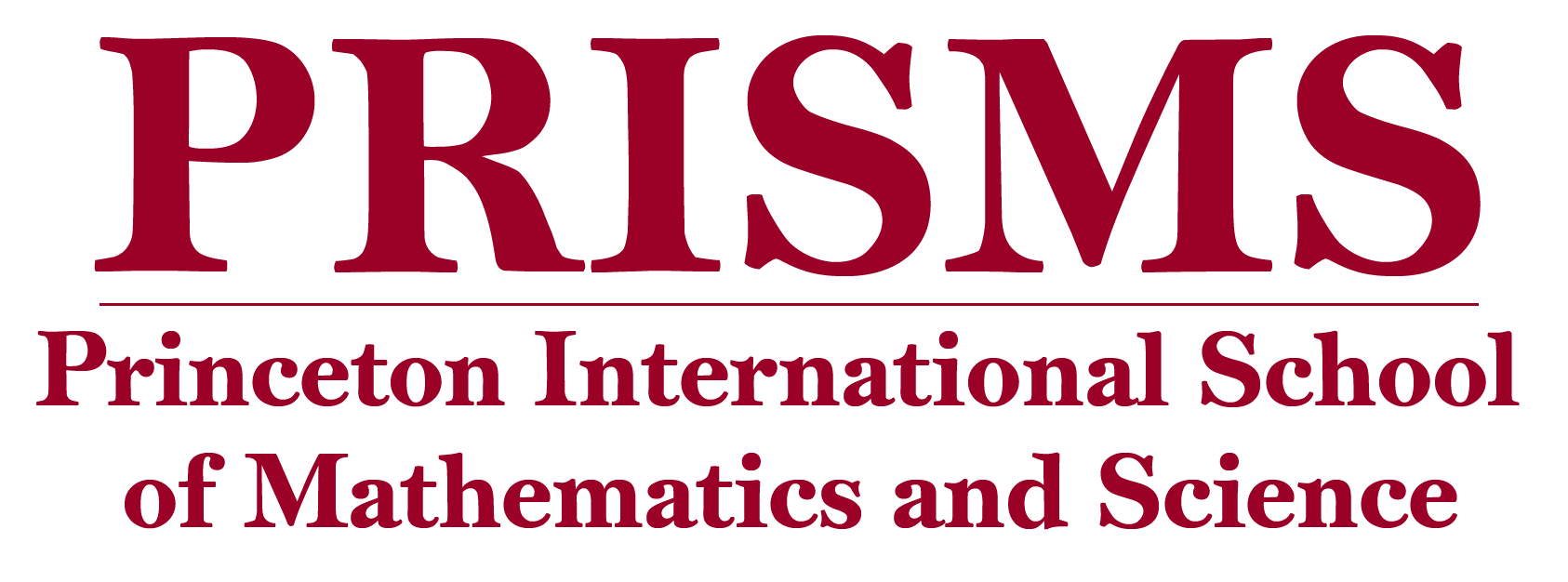

Location
- 19 Lambert Drive; Princeton, NJ; United States
- 40°20′31.5″N 74°41′48.8″W

Information
- Type: Boarding and day school
- Motto: Illuminate powerful ideas; nurture a compassionate community; inspire profound inquiry.
- Established: 2013
- Founder: Jiang Bairong
- NCES School ID: A2102428
- Principal: Adam Kemp & Joseph Li
- Head of school: Pengzhi Liu
- Faculty: 18.9 FTEs
- Grades: 9-12
- Enrollment: 117 (as of 2021–22)
- Student to teacher ratio: 6.2:1
- Campus size: 17 acres (6.9 ha) (original campus)
- Campus type: Suburban
- Annual tuition: $63,500 Boarding $45,000 Day (2023-24)
- Website: www.prismsus.org

The Princeton International School of Mathematics and Science (PRISMS) is a coeducational, independent boarding and day school located in Princeton, New Jersey, United States that provides education to high school students in ninth through twelfth grades. It offers a rigorous academic program in mathematics, science, and engineering, as well as a range of humanities and language courses. The school aims to prepare students for careers in science, technology, engineering, and mathematics (STEM) fields. PRISMS places an emphasis on extracurricular activities, community service, and global citizenship.

The school also places a strong emphasis on developing students' critical thinking, problem-solving, and communication skills.

Admission to PRISMS is selective. The school prepares students for colleges and universities in the US and internationally. As of the 2021–22 school year, the school had an enrollment of 117 students and 18.9 classroom teachers (on an FTE basis), for a student–teacher ratio of 6.2:1. The school's student body was 84.6% (99) Asian, 8.5% (10) two or more races, 6.0% (7) White and 0.9% (1) Hispanic.

The school was founded in 2013 by Jiang Bairong. Plans were announced to expand the school to 300 students, with $20 million committed to startup costs.

The school has 6.41 acres (2.59 ha) of land. The zoning from the American Boychoir School allowed for a maximum of 82 students, and nearby residents voiced opposition to the school's plans for expansion.
