= Vlad Tenev =

Bulgaria-born American entrepreneur (born 1987)

Vladimir Tenev
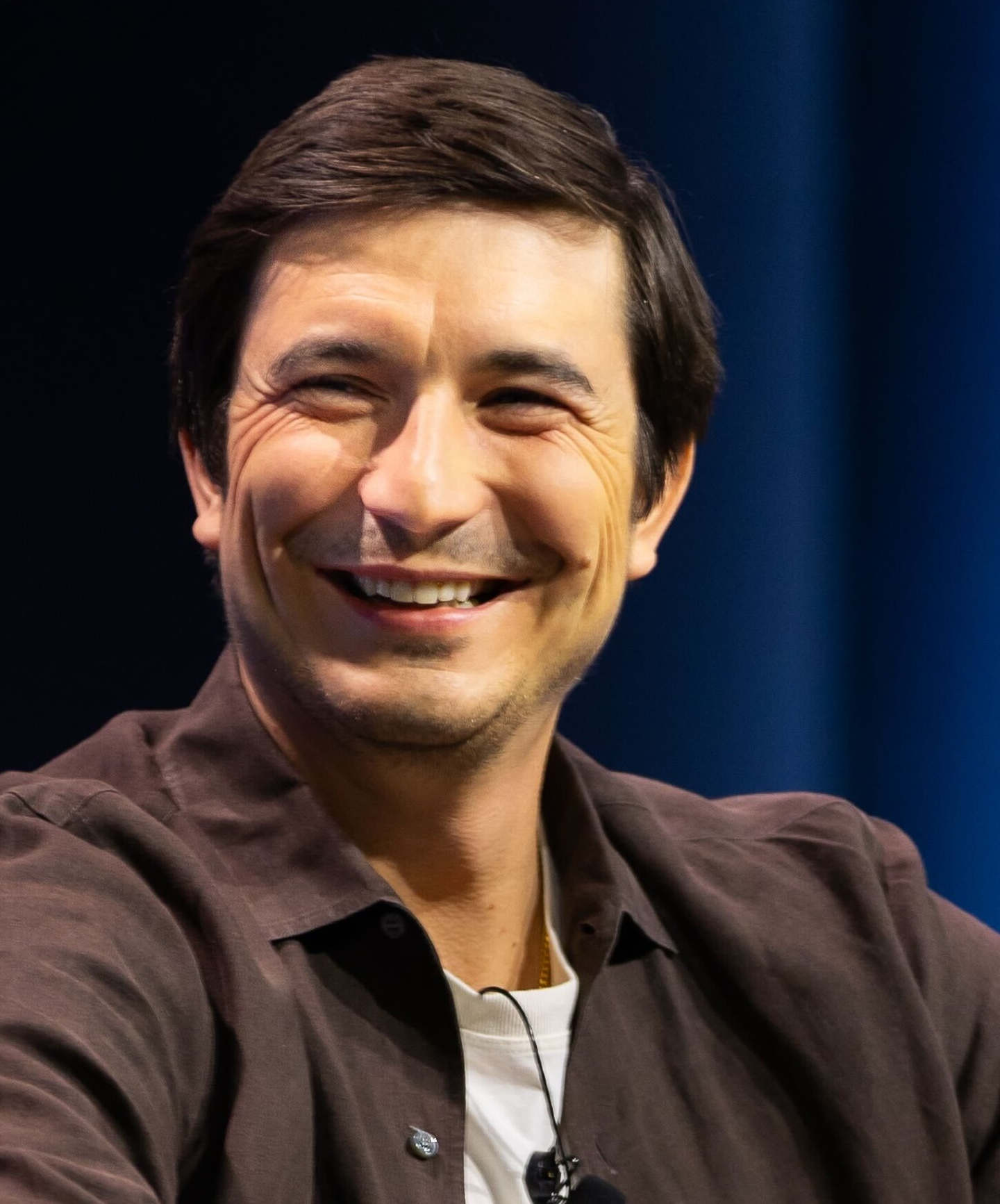
- Tenev in 2025
- Born: February 13, 1987 (age 39); Varna, Bulgaria
- Education: Stanford (BS); UCLA (MS)
- Occupation: Entrepreneur
- Known for: CEO and Co-founder, Robinhood
- Spouse: Celina Tenev
- Children: 3

Vladimir Tenev (Bulgarian: Владимир Тенев; born 13 February 1987) is a Bulgarian-American entrepreneur who is most notably the co-founder, Chairman, and CEO of Robinhood, a US-based financial technology services company.

Tenev moved to the United States from his native Bulgaria at the age of five. After studying mathematics at Stanford and UCLA and getting a master's degree, he decided to partner with Baiju Bhatt to create several fintech startups. One of them, Robinhood, became a publicly-traded multibillion-dollar company.

== Early life and education ==
Tenev was born in Varna, Bulgaria. When he was a toddler, his parents migrated to the U.S., leaving him with his grandparents before he joined them when he was five. Tenev's parents both worked for the World Bank. During childhood, his parents were frugal, having been influenced by financial instability in Bulgaria. He attended Thomas Jefferson High School for Science and Technology in Fairfax County, Virginia.

He earned a bachelor's of science degree in mathematics from Stanford University, where he met Baiju Bhatt. He was a member of a fraternity at Stanford. In 2008, he earned a master's degree in mathematics from the University of California in Los Angeles, and originally intended to study for a PhD in mathematics at UCLA and pursue a career in academia. He instead dropped out to work with Bhatt.

== Career ==
=== Early career ===
In 2010, Tenev and Baiju Bhatt started a high-frequency trading software company called Celeris, based in New York. By January 2011 they abandoned it to create Chronos Research, which sold low-latency software to other trading firms and banks. Later in 2011, they moved to California.

=== Robinhood ===
In 2013, Tenev and Bhatt co-founded the trading platform Robinhood, having been inspired by the 2008 financial crisis and the Occupy Wall Street movement that followed in 2011. Tenev’s wife inspired the name of the company while the app was in development, describing the co-founders as "the Robin Hood of finance." Tenev led the development of the technology and code to create the Robinhood app. During the company's early seed funding phase, Tenev and Bhatt reportedly pitched their concept to approximately 75 investors as they sought to raise capital to satisfy the Financial Industry Regulatory Authority (FINRA) requirements of having sufficient capital to operate as a registered broker-dealer. To secure early backing from venture capitalist Tim Draper, Tenev and Bhatt said they agreed to forgo their salaries until the regulatory license was officially approved for Robinhood. By the end of 2013, Robinhood announced a brokerage that would allow commission-free trading, which caused its waitlist to "explode", according to Tenev. He stated that his goal was commission-free trading throughout the industry.

Tenev and Bhatt became billionaires following a funding round in May 2018 which increased Robinhood's valuation to $6 billion. In November 2020, Tenev became the sole CEO of Robinhood, having previously shared the co-CEO title with Bhatt. The next year, Robinhood debuted on the stock market. The initial public offering (IPO) for the company placed it at a $32 billion valuation.

During the January 2021 GameStop and AMC Entertainment short squeezes, Robinhood restricted users from buying certain stocks and options, citing an inability to meet federal clearinghouse deposit requirements. Tenev publicly defended the decision, which drew backlash from users and politicians who accused the company of protecting institutional investors. On February 18, 2021, Tenev testified before the United States House Committee on Financial Services, apologized for the trading halt, and maintained that he had done nothing wrong. Sebastian Stan portrayed Tenev in the 2023 film Dumb Money, a drama about the GameStop short squeeze.

Tenev has stated that his goal for Robinhood is to become a "financial superapp" rivaling Fidelity Investments and Charles Schwab Corporation, while incorporating AI and blockchain technology.

=== Harmonic ===
Tenev co-founded Palo Alto-based artificial intelligence startup Harmonic in 2023, where he is the executive chairman. Its aim is to reduce AI hallucinations for applications in sectors like automotive, aerospace, and medicine by generating and checking Lean code, and also to improve AI's mathematical skills. When prompted, the company’s chatbot, Aristotle, outputs answers to mathematical queries, along with the reasoning behind its answer. As of June 2024, Harmonic posted an 83% success rate on F2F, a mathematical benchmark, aided by computer algebra systems. The chatbot was trained on synthetic math proofs, a computer-generated example that’s used to teach problem solving, and it displayed a "top-level performance" at the International Mathematical Olympiad in July 2025.

Through November 2025, Harmonic had raised $295 million in total capital, creating a valuation of $1.45 billion.

=== Public speaking ===
Tenev was invited to be the keynote speaker for UCLA's 2019 Math Commencement ceremony. He has also spoken at Fortune Brainstorm Tech, All-In Summit, TEDAI, and TechCrunch Disrupt.

== Personal life ==
Tenev is married to Celina A. Tenev, a co-founder of an emergency health service, Call9. They have three children. Tenev is a fitness enthusiast and credits his training routine with helping him manage stress.

In 2025, Tenev donated $125,000 to the TJ Partnership Fund, the largest donation in the school's history, benefiting his high school alma mater.

=== Views ===
Tenev has spoken about his immigrant upbringing as formative to his orientation towards access to capital and markets, specifically the frugality of his youth, as well as financial instability in Bulgaria.

He has also discussed artificial intelligence's impact on finance and investing, including during a TEDAI Talk, arguing that human traders would remain central despite advances in automation.

In June 2018, Tenev stated in an interview with CB Insights that he was an early and vocal supporter of crypto, going on to highlight its "staying power" during Robinhood's launch of its crypto offerings.

== Recognition ==
Year	Awards	Category	Result	Ref.
2016	Forbes 30 Under 30	Young Traders	Won	
2022	Forbes 30 Under 30 Hall of Fame			
2025	Fortune 100 Most Powerful People in Business			
2025	Forbes 400			
