= Robinhood (company) =

US-based financial services company

Robinhood Markets, Inc.
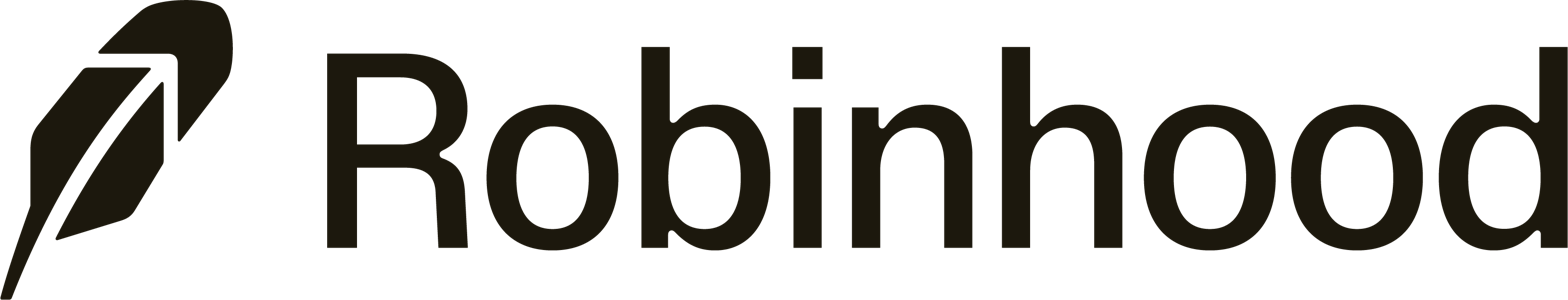
- Type: Public
- Traded as: Nasdaq: HOOD (Class A); S&P 500 component
- Industry: Financial services
- Founded: April 18, 2013; 13 years ago
- Founders: Vladimir Tenev; Baiju Bhatt
- Headquarters: Menlo Park, California, U.S.
- Area served: United States; United Kingdom; European Union
- Key people: Vladimir Tenev (CEO)
- Services: Stockbroker; Electronic trading platform
- Revenue: ▲US$4.47 billion (2025)
- Operating income: ▲US$2.09 billion (2025)
- Net income: ▲US$1.88 billion (2025)
- Total assets: ▲US$38.1 billion (2025)
- Total equity: ▲US$9.15 billion (2025)
- Owners: Vladimir Tenev (5.4% equity; 26.1% voting); Baiju Bhatt (6.8% equity; 32.0% voting)
- Number of employees: 2,900 (2025)
- Website: robinhood.com

Robinhood Markets, Inc. is an American financial services company based in Menlo Park, California. It provides an electronic trading platform that facilitates trades of stocks, exchange-traded funds (ETFs), options, index options, futures contracts, event contracts on prediction markets, and cryptocurrency. It also offers cryptocurrency wallets, wealth management, credit cards and other banking services, some in partnership with banks insured by the FDIC, and operates a venture capital arm as well as an independent media subsidiary, Sherwood.News.

The company has more than 27 million funded customers and $307 billion total platform assets. Its platform is available in the U.S., the UK, and, for trading cryptocurrency and tokenized stocks and ETFs, in the European Union. Bitstamp, its cryptocurrency exchange, holds licenses in Singapore, Luxembourg, the UK, Slovenia and the U.S.

The company does not allow trading in mutual funds, preferred stocks, bonds, some high-risk penny stocks, and new positions in options on their expiration dates in the last 30 minutes of the trading day.

== History ==
=== 2013-2019: Foundation, options and cryptocurrency trading ===
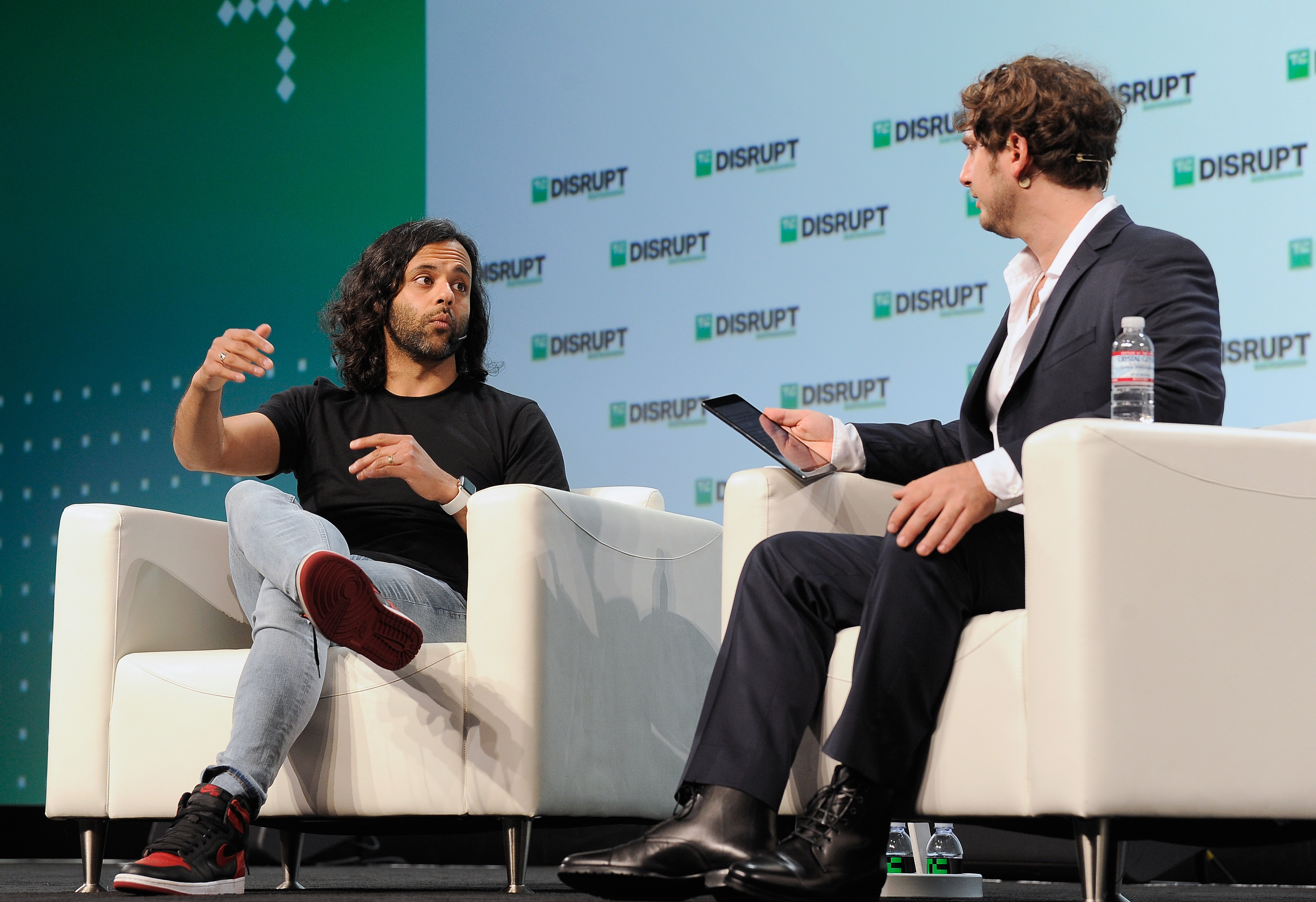
Robinhood co-founder Baiju Bhatt (left) and moderator Josh Constine (right) speak onstage during Day 2 of TechCrunch Disrupt SF 2018 at the Moscone Center on September 6, 2018, in San Francisco, California.

Robinhood was founded in April 2013 by Vladimir Tenev and Baiju Bhatt, two former Stanford classmates who had previously built high-frequency trading platforms for financial institutions in New York City. The company is named after Robin Hood, based on its self-stated mission to "democratize finance for all". Tenev and Bhatt served as co-CEOs from 2013 to 2020, when Tenev became the sole CEO and Bhatt became chief creative officer.

In December 2013, Robinhood closed its seed funding round, securing $3 million in an investment led by Index Ventures, with participation from Andreessen Horowitz, Rothenberg Ventures, Tim Draper, and Howard Lindzon. The founders presented the mobile app at LA Hacks in April 2014 and launched a beta release in December on the Apple App Store. That September, Robinhood raised $13 million in a Series A round, with returning investors Index Ventures and Howard Lindzon, as well as new investors Ribbit Capital, Aaron Levie, Dave Morin, Jared Leto, Snoop Dogg, and Nas.

The mobile app was launched officially in March 2015. In May 2015, the company raised $50 million in a Series B round led by New Enterprise Associates.

Robinhood raised $110 million in a Series C round at a $1.3 billion valuation in April 2017, bringing its total funding raised to $176 million. Investors included Yuri Milner of DST Global, Greenoaks Capital, and Thrive Capital. In December 2017, the company launched commission-free options trading.

In February 2018, the company announced that it would be moving its headquarters from Palo Alto to the former headquarters of Sunset magazine in Menlo Park. That same month, Robinhood launched cryptocurrency trading. Later that year, the company launched its own clearing system.

In May 2018, Robinhood closed a $363 million Series D financing round led by DST Global, bringing its total equity funding to $539 million. Robinhood raised $323 million in a Series E venture funding round led by DST Global, the following July.

In March 2019, Robinhood acquired MarketSnacks, a financial newsletter. Robinhood launched banking products with insurance from the Federal Deposit Insurance Corporation via partner banks in December 2019.

The Financial Industry Regulatory Authority fined Robinhood $1.25 million in December 2019 for failing to determine whether its market makers provided the best execution quality as compared to other execution venues.

=== 2020-2021: Increased usage and Game Stop short squeeze ===
In the second quarter of 2020, during the 2020 stock market crash, compared to the first quarter of 2020, trading volumes increased 139%, more than any other major brokerage.

In May 2020, Robinhood raised $280 million in a Series F venture funding round led by Sequoia Capital at a pre-money valuation of $8.3 billion. Robinhood began offering additional guidance and requiring additional criteria and education for customers seeking authorization to trade options after a University of Nebraska–Lincoln student died by suicide in June 2020 after seeing a six-figure negative cash balance on his account.

In August 2020, the company announced a $200 million Series G funding round from a new investor, D1 Capital Partners.

In October 2020, Robinhood found that almost 2,000 Robinhood accounts were compromised and that the hackers had siphoned off customer funds. The users' personal email addresses had been compromised outside of Robinhood and the company fully compensated customers if they lost money because of unauthorized activity.

In December 2020, the company paid $65 million to settle accusations by the U.S. Securities and Exchange Commission that it failed to disclose payment for order flow, that some customers' orders lost a total of approximately $34.1 million in price improvement compared to the best execution by other brokers, and that Robinhood made false and misleading statements about its execution quality.

Also in December 2020, Robinhood was sued in the United States District Court for the Northern District of California for failing to disclose to customers that it received payment for order flow. The case was consolidated with others under In re Robinhood Order Flow Litigation (No. 4:20-cv-09328) and was settled for $2 million in December 2025.

Also in December 2020, the Securities Division of the Massachusetts Secretary of the Commonwealth filed an administrative complaint alleging violation of state securities laws and claimed that Robinhood exploited novice investors with gamification. In March 2022, the Suffolk County Superior Court declared that the new fiduciary duty rule underlying parts of the case was invalid. In February 2024, the company paid $7.5 million and agreed to overhaul its digital engagement practices to settle the remaining claims.

On January 28, 2021, several broker-dealers, including Robinhood Securities, restricted the purchase of certain stocks, most notably GameStop, to meet collateral requirements at its clearing house, the National Securities Clearing Corporation, following an effort by users of the r/wallstreetbets subreddit to drive up share prices. Robinhood Securities faced an increase in its collateral requirement from $700 million to $3.7 billion, later reduced to $1.4 billion. The company began once again allowing trading in the affected stocks on January 29.

The decision to halt trading was criticized by customers as well as politicians including Ted Cruz and Alexandria Ocasio-Cortez. The House Committee on Financial Services questioned Robinhood CEO Vladimir Tenev during a hearing on February 18, 2021.

Protests were held outside Robinhood headquarters in Menlo Park, California, at the U.S. Securities and Exchange Commission headquarters in Washington, D.C., and the New York Stock Exchange.

On January 28, 2021, a class-action lawsuit against Robinhood was filed in the Southern District of New York alleging market manipulation and collusion with market maker Citadel Securities to deprive investors of the ability to invest in the open market in violation of Section 1 of the Sherman Antitrust Act, which prohibits agreements in restraint of trade. The case was dismissed by the Miami federal court in November 2021 on the grounds that the plaintiffs fell short of providing direct evidence of an antitrust conspiracy and that its terms of service allowed the company to prohibit trading by customers. In 2024, an appeals court affirmed the dismissal of the case.

=== 2021-2024: Initial public offering ===
In January 2021, Robinhood raised $3.4 billion in capital during the "meme stock" frenzy which exceeded the total amount of funding raised in the company's history.

In March 2021, Robinhood acquired Binc, a recruiting firm.

In late June 2021, Robinhood was fined $57 million by the Financial Industry Regulatory Authority (FINRA) related to the March 2020 outages and was ordered to pay restitution to affected clients in the largest penalty ever issued by the agency. In 2022, the company agreed to pay $9.9 million to settle class action lawsuits regarding trading losses due to the outages.

The company went public via an initial public offering on the Nasdaq on July 29, 2021 under the ticker HOOD, raising approximately $2.1 billion and valuing Robinhood at about $32 billion. In August 2021, Robinhood completed the $140 million acquisition of Say Technologies, a company that helps shareholders vote proxies and ask questions of management.

In November 2021, a voice phishing scheme on a Robinhood employee resulted in about 5 million customers having their email addresses disclosed, 2 million customers having their full names disclosed and 300 customers having their dates of birth disclosed. It is believed that the person who was responsible for the 2021 FBI email hack and was arrested in March 2023, was responsible for the breach.

In December 2021, Robinhood acquired Cove Markets, a developer of cryptocurrency trading platforms.

In April 2022, Robinhood cut its workforce by 9%. In August that year, the company announced additional layoffs of 23% of its workforce, mostly in operations, marketing and program management.

In August 2022, Robinhood's crypto unit was fined $30 million by the New York State Department of Financial Services for allegedly violating anti-money-laundering and cybersecurity regulations, in the department's first cryptocurrency-related enforcement action.

In November 2022, as part of the bankruptcy of FTX, the U.S. government seized the 7.6% stake in Robinhood owned by Alameda Research, which were used as partial collateral for a transfer of at least $4 billion from FTX. The shares were sold back to Robinhood for $605 million, or $10.96 per share.

In June 2023, Robinhood completed the $95 million acquisition of X1, a credit card issuance startup. Robinhood announced additional layoffs of 150 employees or about 7% of its staff that same month. In December 2023, Robinhood acquired Chartr, a publisher of a daily financial newsletter.

=== 2024-present: Product and international expansion ===
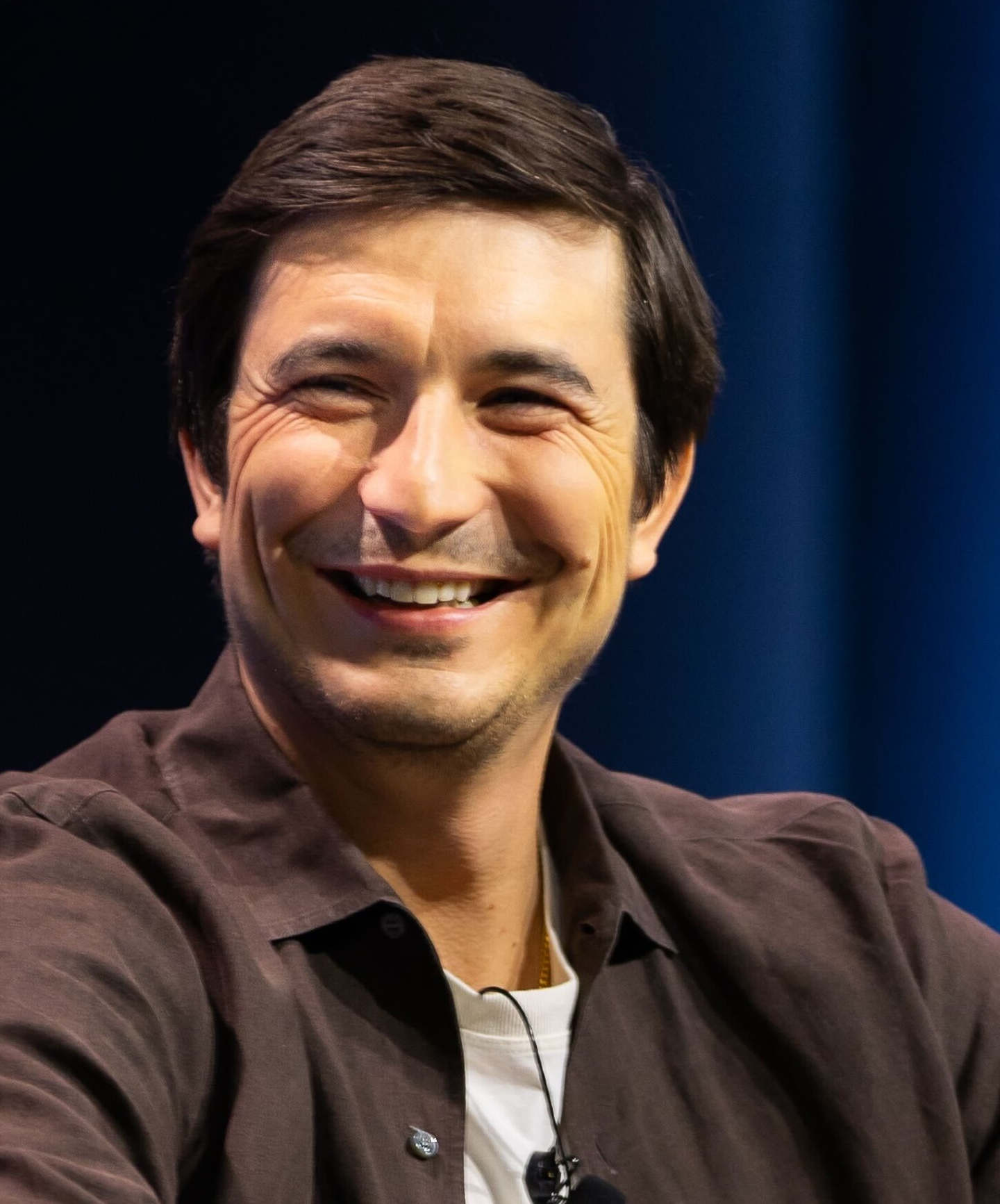
Co-founder Vladimir Tenev in 2025

In March 2024, Robinhood acquired Marex FCM, a broker of futures contracts. Robinhood also expanded its services to the United Kingdom. The following month, Robinhood launched its "Sherwood News" website and a rebrand of its financial newsletter Snacks. In March 2024, the company launched the Robinhood Gold credit card. In July 2024, Robinhood acquired Pluto Capital, an AI-powered investment research platform. In October 2024, Robinhood launched Legend, a desktop trading platform.

In August 2024, Robinhood's crypto unit paid $3.9 million and instituted changes to settle claims by the State of California that, between 2018 and 2022, customers could not make timely withdrawals of cryptocurrency from their Robinhood Crypto accounts to cryptocurrency wallets.

In February 2025, Robinhood completed the $300 million acquisition of TradePMR, a wealth management platform. In March 2025, Robinhood announced the launch of wealth management services, including Robinhood Strategies as well as an AI investment tool, Robinhood Cortex. The following month, the Bank of Lithuania granted the company a brokerage license to operate in Lithuania. Soon after, Robinhood received its MiFID and MICA licenses, allowing Robinhood Europe to operate as a crypto-asset service and payment institution. In May 2025, Robinhood announced that it would acquire WonderFi, a cryptocurrency trading platform based in Canada.

In March 2025, subsidiaries of Robinhood were fined $26 million by the Financial Industry Regulatory Authority for violating numerous rules, which led to the firms’ inability to detect, investigate, or report suspicious activities and were ordered to pay $3.75 million in restitution to certain customers whose market orders were collared and canceled, who then reentered their orders and received executions at prices less favorable than the market prices available at the time the customers initially entered their orders.

In June 2025, the company launched trading in tokenized ETFs and stocks in the European Union. At the time of the launch, the company was operating in 30 countries and had more than 26 million users in total. Robinhood also completed the $200 million acquisition of Bitstamp, a cryptocurrency exchange.

In September 2025, the company introduced Robinhood Social, a social media platform for traders. In November 2025, Robinhood announced a joint venture with Susquehanna International Group to acquire MIAXdx; the acquisition closed in January 2026.

In December 2025, Robinhood announced that it would acquire PT Buana Capital Sekuritas, an Indonesian brokerage, and PT Pedagang Aset Kripto, an Indonesian financial asset trader. In March 2026, Robinhood Ventures Fund I (RVI), a closed-end fundmanaged by Robinhood Ventures focused on late-stage, well-established private companies, went public on the New York Stock Exchange. In August 2026 a second closed end fund focused on early and growth-stage private companies known as Robinhood Ventures Fund II (RVII) went public.

== Business model ==
Robinhood operates an electronic trading and investing platform that allows users to trade stocks, exchange-traded funds, options, index options, futures contracts, event contracts tied to prediction markets, and cryptocurrency. In addition to brokerage, the company offers other services such as cryptocurrency wallets, wealth management, checking and saving accounts through a partner bank (deposits are FDIC insured) and credit cards. It does not allow trading in mutual funds, preferred stocks, bonds, some high-risk penny stocks, and new positions in options on their expiration dates in the last 30 minutes of the trading day. Robinhood's platform is available in the United States and United Kingdom. In the European Union, trading only includes cryptocurrency and tokenized stocks and ETFs.

The company has been described as an innovator in zero-commission stock trading. Apart from transaction-based revenue, it also generates income through subscription fees for its Robinhood Gold service and other fees associated with its financial products. Robinhood has expanded the appeal of retail investing to millennials and has been credited with the industry shift away from traditional trading fees. As of March 2025, the average age of its customers was 35.

== Structure and financials ==
=== Company structure ===
Robinhood Markets is a financial services company that operates subsidiaries such as Robinhood Financial for brokerage operations, Robinhood Securities for clearing operations, Robinhood Crypto for cryptocurrency trading, Robinhood Money for banking offerings, Robinhood Asset Management for wealth management, Robinhood Derivatives for futures trading, and Sherwood Media, a financial news producer. Outside the United States, its subsidiaries include Robinhood UK and Robinhood Europe.

=== Financials ===
Financials of Robinhood Markets
Year	Revenue in million US$	Net income in million US$	Assets in million US$
2020	$958	$7	$10,988
2021	$1,815	$-3,687	$19,769
2022	$1,358	$-1,028	$23,337
2023	$1,865	$-541	$23,337
2024	$2,951	$1,411	$26,187
2025	$4,473	$1,883	

The company's revenue comes from payment for order flow, commissions, or other fees on options (24% of Q1 2026 revenues), cryptocurrency (13% of Q1 2026 revenues), equities (8% of Q1 2026 revenues), and other transaction-based products including instant withdrawals, event contracts and futures (14% of Q1 2026 revenues); net interest income from margin lending, interest earned on corporate and customer cash balances, securities lending, and credit cards (34% of Q1 2026 revenues); and other revenues, primarily from subscription fees on its Robinhood Gold product and proxy revenues (5% of Q1 2026 revenues).

== Regulation ==
Robinhood Markets operates through several regulated subsidiaries subject to oversight by U.S. financial authorities. Robinhood Financial and Robinhood Securities are registered with the U.S. Securities and Exchange Commission and are members of the Financial Industry Regulatory Authority. Robinhood Crypto operates within a fragmented regulatory framework in which digital asset platforms are subject to a combination of federal oversight and state-level licensing requirements. Robinhood Derivatives is registered with the Commodity Futures Trading Commission and member of National Futures Association.

== See also ==
- List of electronic trading platforms
