= Codewars =

Computer programming community and challenge site

- Company type: Private
- Website type: Technology
- Founded: November 2012; 13 years ago
- Founders: Nathan Doctor and Jake Hoffner
- Website: www.codewars.com

Codewars is an educational community for computer programming. On the platform, software developers train on programming challenges known as kata. These discrete programming exercises train a range of skills in a variety of programming languages, and are completed within an online integrated development environment. On Codewars the community and challenge progression is gamified, with users earning ranks and honor for completing kata, contributing kata, and quality solutions.

The platform is owned and operated by Qualified, a technology company that provides a platform for assessing and training software engineering skills.

== History ==
Founded by Nathan Doctor and Jake Hoffner in November 2012, the project initially began at a Startup Weekend competition that year, where it was prototyped. It was awarded first place in that competition, drawing the attention of engineers, and funding interest from two of the judges Paige Craig (angel investor) and Brian Lee (entrepreneur).

After building the first production iteration of the platform, it was launched to the Hacker News community, receiving significant attention for its challenge format and signing up approximately 10,000 users within that weekend.

== See also ==
- CodeFights
- CodinGame
- Competitive programming
- HackerRank
