= Titan (email) =

Email Servicing agency

- Original author(s): Bhavin Turakhia
- Initial release: 2018
- Operating system: iOS; Android; Chrome macOS; Windows
- Type: Business email, Professional Email
- Website: titan.email

Titan is a business email service founded by Bhavin Turakhia in 2018. The service may be accessed through the Titan website and through the web, Android, and iOS.

== History ==
Titan was founded by Bhavin Turakhia, founder of Flock, CodeChef and Zeta, in 2018 to provide a suite of professional email services for small and medium businesses.

In August 2021, Titan received Series A funding from Automattic valuing the startup at $300 million. Titan has around 100,000 active users including users at educational institutions like Eastern Florida State College. The startup looks to add another 100,000 accounts in the next one year.

Titan is available to customers via website builders and domain registrars. It has partnerships with WordPress.com, HostGator Brazil, NameSilo, Hostinger, and Rumahweb.

== Features ==
- Follow Up Reminders - Allows the user to set up reminders for sending important emails and undo sent emails.
- Read Receipts - User can use the read receipt to check if the recipient has read the email.
- Import Email Data - User can import all their existing emails and contacts, including messages and email addresses of a previous account, to the newly created email account in Titan.
- Email Templates - User can use templates to expedite their reply.
