= Indian Institute of Information Technology, Allahabad =

Research institute in Prayagraj, Uttar Pradesh, India

Indian Institute of Information Technology Allahabad
- The logo signifies the confluence of the rivers Ganga and Yamuna at the Triveni Sangam in Prayagraj.
- Motto: प्रज्ञानम् ब्रह्म (Sanskrit)
- Motto in English: "Consciousness is Brahma"
- Type: Public
- Established: August 12, 1999; 27 years ago
- Chairperson: Bhim Singh
- Director: Mukul Sharad Sutaone
- Faculty: 82
- Students: 2725
- Undergraduates: 1882
- Postgraduates: 445
- Doctoral students: 398
- Location: Prayagraj, Uttar Pradesh, India; 25°25′48″N 81°46′19″E
- Campus: 40 ha (100 acres); Urban
- Colors: Red
- Website: iiita.ac.in
- Location within Uttar Pradesh Location within India

The Indian Institute of Information Technology Allahabad (IIIT Allahabad or IIITA or IIIT-A) is a public institute of information technology and biomedical engineering located in Jhalwa, Prayagraj (previously known as Allahabad), in Uttar Pradesh. It is one of the twenty-five Indian Institutes of Information Technology listed by the Ministry of Education and is widely regarded as a Tier-1 institute in India.

== History ==
In 1998, the Ministry of Human Resources Development (HRD) announced the establishment of the second Indian Institute of Information Technology of the country in Allahabad, which was the hometown of the then Minister of Human Resource Development (HRD Minister), Murli Manohar Joshi.

The institute was founded on 12 August 1999 and designated a deemed university in 2000. In 2014 the IIIT Act was passed, under which IIIT-A and four other Institutes of Information Technology funded by the Ministry of Human Resource Development were classed as Institutes of National Importance.

An extension campus of the institute was opened in Amethi in 2005, but was closed down in 2016.

IIIT-A hosted seven Science Conclaves on the lines of the Lindau Nobel Laureate Meetings, from 2008 to 2014, which were attended by Nobel laureates like Claude Cohen-Tannoudji, Douglas D. Osheroff, Ivan Giaever, and many others.

M. D. Tiwari was the first director of the institute, and he remained in that position until December 2013, when Allahabad High Court asked him to step down, dismissing Tiwari's plea who had challenged the chancellor's order to relinquish the post upon completion of tenure. There had previously been demands for Tiwari's resignation by students, for being "high-handed" and misusing his powers and position.

== Academics ==
The curriculum of the institute lays focus on information technology, biomedical engineering, electronics and communication and related fields such as computer vision, human–computer interaction and their interdisciplinary applications across other domains.

IIIT-Allahabad is also known for its strong competitive coding culture.

=== Academic departments ===
- Applied Science
- Electronics and Communication Engineering
- Information Technology
- Management Studies

=== Programs ===
The institute has four departments, viz. Department of Applied Sciences, Department of Electronics and Communication Engineering, Department of Information Technology, and Department of Management Studies; which offer the following academic programs:

- Bachelor of Technology (Information Technology)
- Bachelor of Technology (Electronics & Communication Engineering)
- Bachelor of Technology (IT specialization in Business Informatics)
- Master of Technology (Information Technology)
- Master of Technology (Electronics and Communication Engineering)
- Master of Technology (Bioinformatics)
- Master of Technology (Biomedical Engineering)
- Master of Technology (Quantum Information Technologies)
- Master of Business Administration
- Doctor of Philosophy Ph.D.

Under the National Education Policy 2020, the institute will offer major degrees in information technology and electronics & communication, along with minor degrees in Indian knowledge system, entrepreneurship development, psychology, and legal knowledge. There will also be an option of multiple exit and entry for the students. If a student studies in the BTech program for one year, they will be given a certificate. Diploma will be awarded on two years of study and Bachelor of Science (BS) degree on three years of study. Finally, the BTech degree will be given on completion of four years of studies.

In the 2024–2025 academic session, IIIT Allahabad introduced a Master of Technology (M.Tech.) program in biomedical engineering under the Department of Applied Sciences. And in 2026, the institute announced the launch of a new M.Tech. program in Quantum Information and Technology (QIT) from the 2026–2027 academic session.

=== Research ===
The institute conducts research across information technology, electronics, applied sciences, and interdisciplinary engineering, carried out through its academic departments and laboratories with support from government agencies and industry partners.

The Department of Applied Sciences works in biomedical engineering, bioinformatics, BioMEMS, microfluidics, biosensors, nanobiotechnology, biomechanics, biomedical instrumentation, computational biology, and healthcare analytics. It offers postgraduate programmes in Bioinformatics and Biomedical Engineering, and its research sits at the interface of engineering, medicine, and life sciences.

Faculty have set up research laboratories in BioMEMS, microfluidics, point-of-care diagnostics, and biomedical devices. Their work has produced patents, publications, and externally funded projects with academic institutions, hospitals, and government funding agencies.

Some of this work has made it into the news. In 2025, a research team developed a low-cost microfluidic device for rapid blood plasma separation and water purification. In 2026, another team patented a smart pill dispensing system aimed at improving medication adherence among elderly patients and people with chronic diseases.

=== Research laboratories ===
==== Systems Biology Laboratory ====
Led by Pritish Kumar Varadwaj, the laboratory works on protein structure and function prediction, ligand-binding-site prediction and graph-theoretic analysis of biological sequences, alongside computational modelling of cellular metabolism, and has produced web-based tools including DeepLnc, DeepInteract, Pharmadoop, DUSR and CEMDB. Reported projects include an industry-funded consultancy on a machine-learning platform for chemical interaction (2025–2026), an ICMR-funded project on an artificial-intelligence-based CMOS sensor system for non-invasive detection of Parkinson's disease (2023–2025), and a Department of Biotechnology-funded facility for big-data analytics of large-scale genomics and proteomics data.

==== Bio-MEMS Laboratory ====
Led by Amit Prabhakar, the laboratory designs and fabricates micro-electromechanical systems, microfluidic device and lab-on-chip platforms for biomedical and diagnostic use, with an emphasis on low-cost, polymer-based microfabrication and rapid prototyping. Reported work includes organ-on-chip and blood-on-chip platforms for drug-toxicity testing and integrated biosensor modules for point-of-care diagnostics. Patents credited to the laboratory cover a polymer microstructure fabrication system, a CNC-mountable Z-axis assembly for three-dimensional printers, and a low-cost organ-on-chip fabrication technique.

==== Nanobiotechnology and Informatics Laboratory ====
Led by Amaresh Kumar Sahoo, the laboratory synthesises and characterises nanoscale materials for antibacterial activity, biosensing, bioimaging and targeted drug delivery, combining experimental work with computational studies of nanomaterial–biomacromolecule interactions. It has reported an ICMR-supported project on photoacoustic detection and quantification of multiple blood parameters for portable point-of-care analysis.

==== Biomedical Imaging Laboratory ====
Led by Ratan K. Saha, the laboratory develops photoacoustic and ultrasonic imaging techniques for characterising biological tissue and blood, combining theoretical modelling, numerical simulation, phantom experiments and custom imaging-system design. Reported projects include a Science and Engineering Research Board (SERB-DST) grant for photoacoustic tomography (2024–2027) and a Department of Biotechnology-funded study of blood imaging and tissue characterisation (2023–2025).

=== Patents and technology transfer ===
Patent filings credited to the bioengineering group span diagnostic, fabrication and environmental technologies, including a polymer microstructure fabrication system; a CNC-mountable Z-axis assembly for 3D printers; a low-cost organ-on-chip fabrication technique; a personalised tuberculosis-treatment recommendation system; a method for degrading dye-containing industrial effluent using potato-peel-derived carbon-dot nanobots; and a method for rapid detection of coronavirus using highly luminescent gold nanoclusters. The department's own materials describe further, unspecified patents filed in the areas of biosensors, drug delivery, nanotechnology and artificial intelligence in healthcare, alongside more than two hundred research-paper publications and conference presentations attributed to the group.

=== Rankings ===
University and College rankings

Engineering – India
- NIRF (2024): 87
- India Today (2024): 11
- Outlook India (2024): 19

Internationally, IIIT-Allahabad was ranked 509 in Asia in the QS World University Rankings of 2026, and 1401+ in the world in 2026 rankings. In India, IIIT-Allahabad was ranked 87th among engineering colleges by the National Institutional Ranking Framework (NIRF) in 2024.

It was also ranked 11 by India Today and 19 by Outlook India in 2024.

In 2016, IIIT-Allahabad was included in the list of "Best universities in the world for learning to code" by Times Higher Education, based on its rank (#46) in HackerRank's University Rankings Competition.

== Campus ==
=== Jhalwa ===
The 40 ha (100 acres) campus of IIIT-A is situated in Devghat, Jhalwa, on the outskirts of Prayagraj.

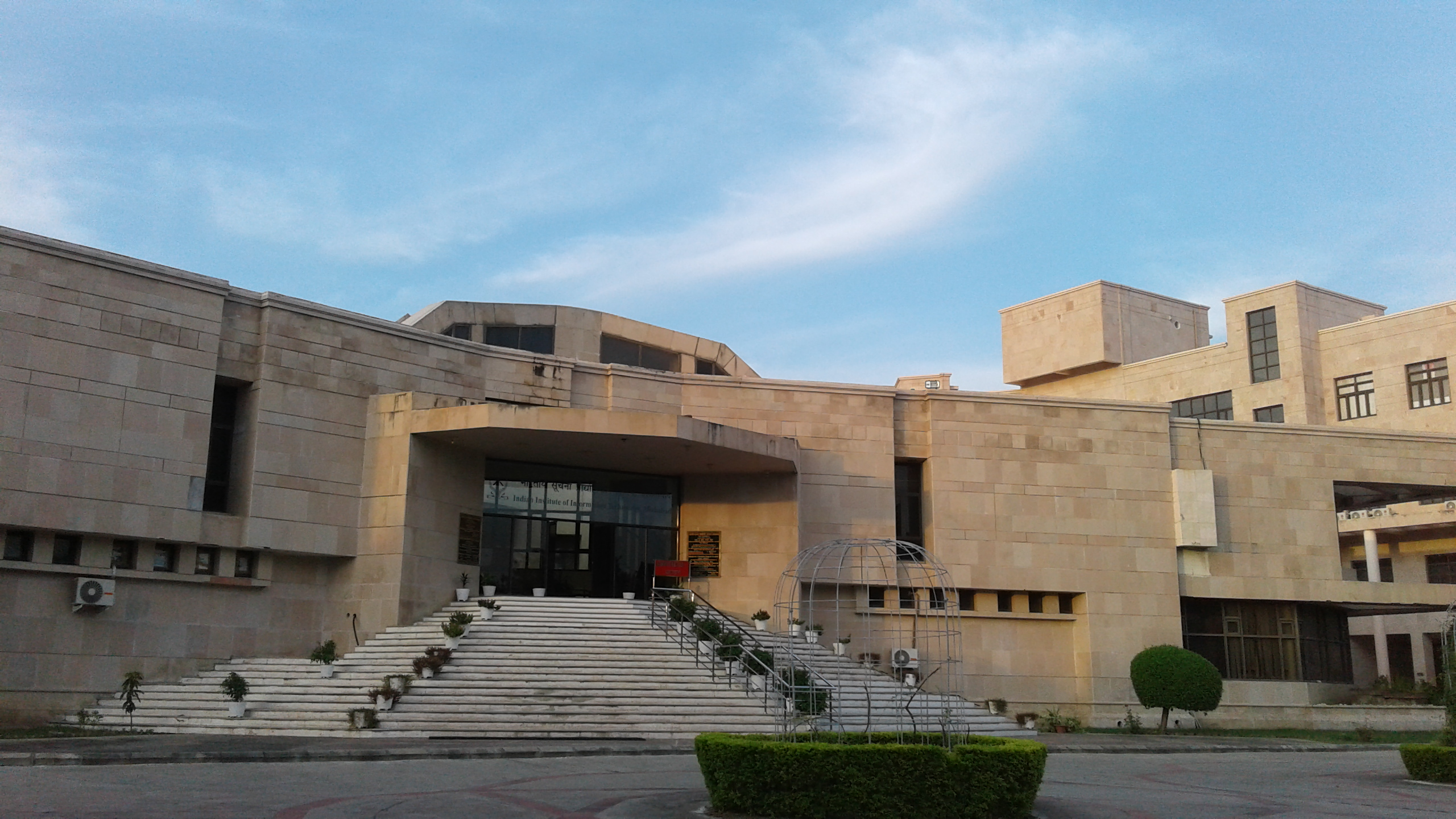
Administrative Building

Since the first phase of construction of the campus which started in 2001, academic buildings were designed on the basis of Penrose geometry, styled on tessellations developed by Roger Penrose the mathematical physicist.

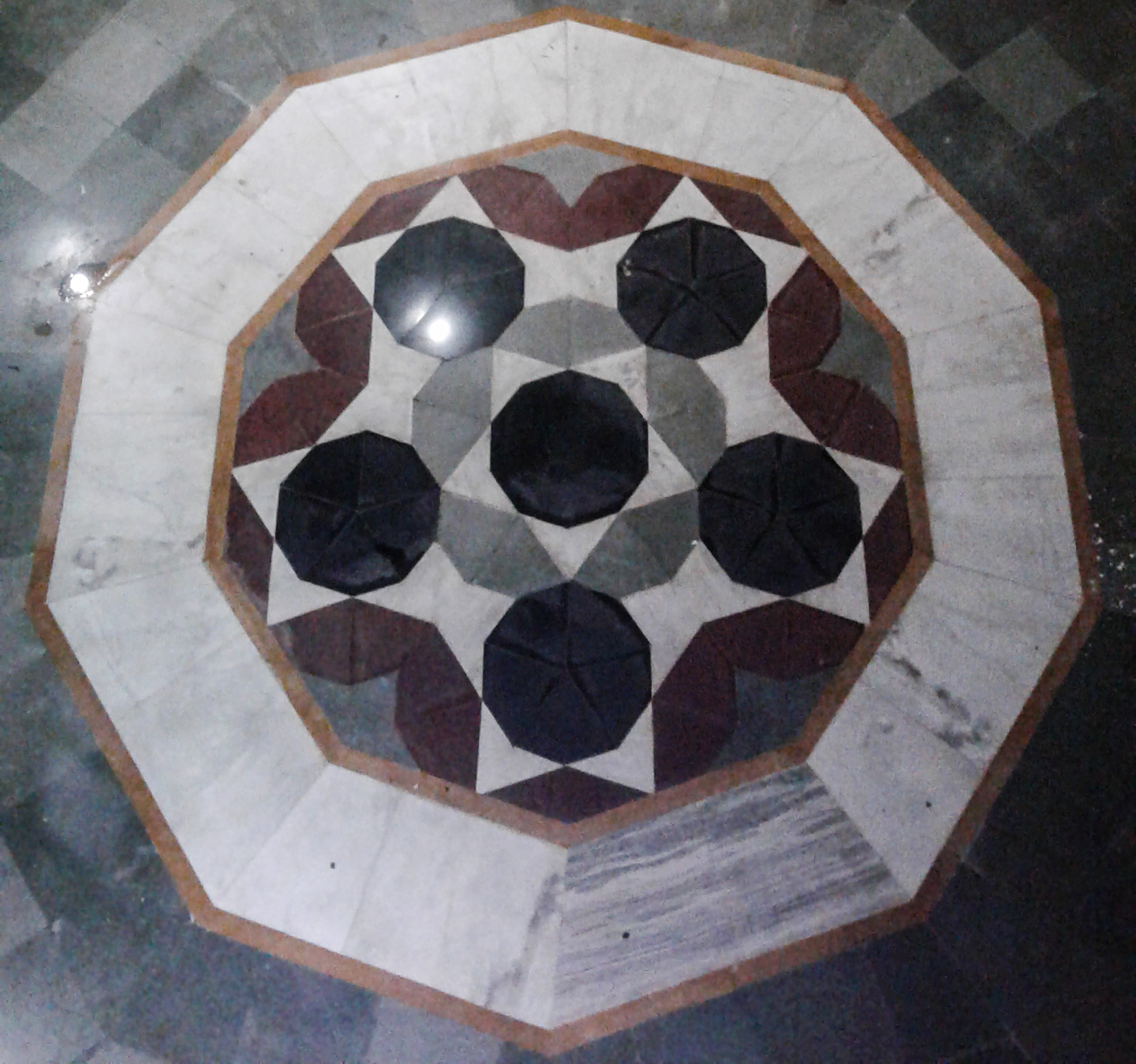
Penrose tiling in the ground floor of CC-III

Within the Penrose layout for the campus, a central zone was marked out for the academic core consisting of an administrative building, lecture theatre complex, electronic library, computer laboratories and research facilities, as student intake increased in 2009–2010.

Computer Center III or CC-III, also known as C. V. Raman Bhavan, named for C. V. Raman, winner of the Nobel Prize in Physics, is a six-storied structure which was designed as a "micro campus" in itself, having classrooms, faculty rooms, research areas and computer labs under one roof.

The campus also has a state of the art auditorium, and a sports complex that comprises a football ground with a pavilion, a swimming pool, and basketball, tennis, and squash courts. The Student Activity Centre (SAC) has a table tennis facility and a billiards room, and has clubrooms too for various student societies.

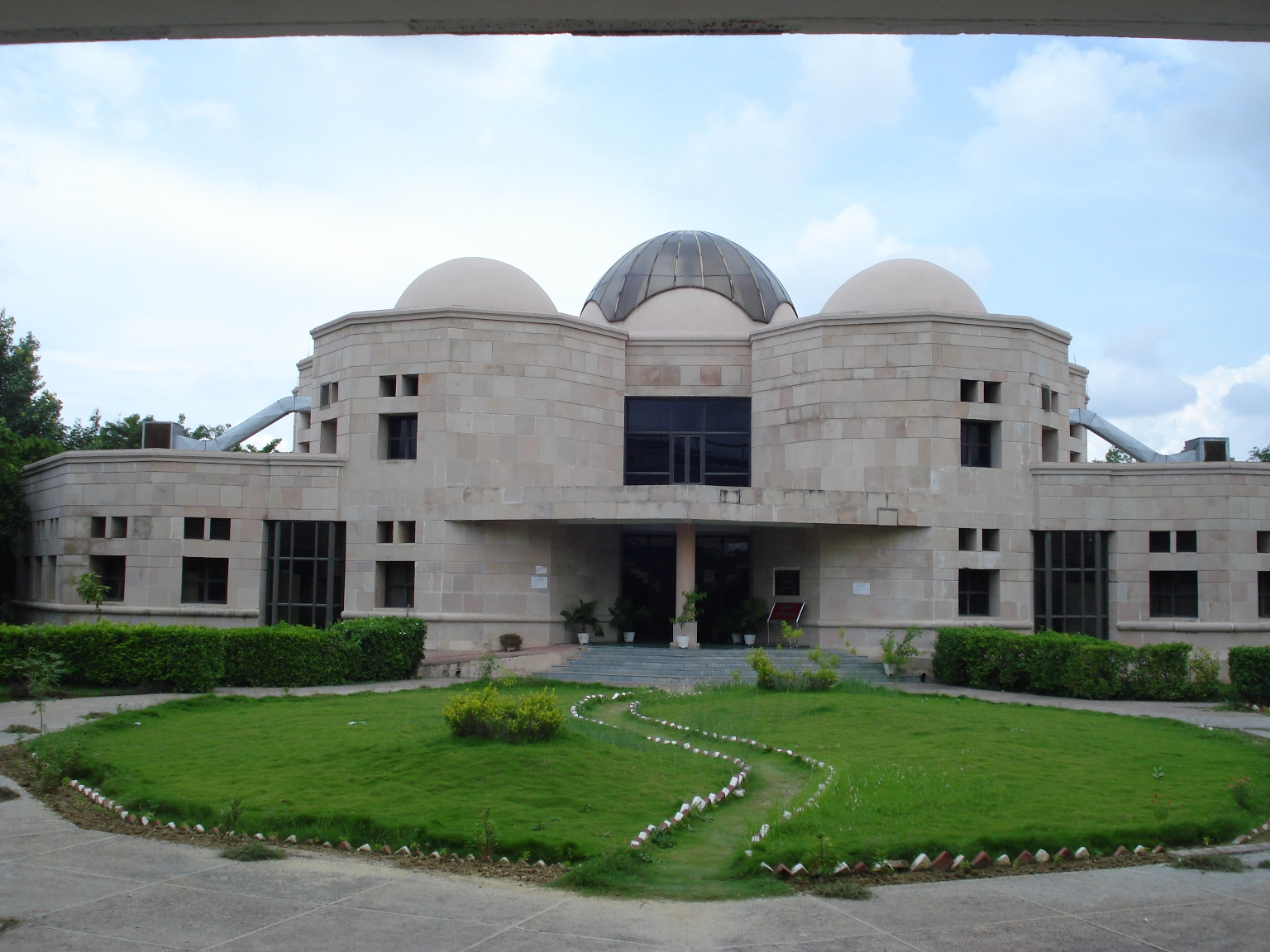
Central library

There are accommodation facilities for faculty members, staff and students, with separate hostels for men, women, and visitors.

In 2019, Murli Manohar Joshi inaugurated the open stage and the clock tower, which were dedicated to him and titled Murli Manohar Muktangan, as he was the one who envisioned a IIIT in Allahabad as the HRD Minister.

The campus ring road was named as Late Ramegowda Ring Road after the former All India Council for Technical Education (AICTE) chairman who headed the Central Government panel which came up with the idea of setting up IIITs. Main Gate-2 of the institute was dedicated to M. G. K. Menon who played a key role in setting up of IIIT-A, as chairman of the Board of Governors; and Gate-1 was named after AR Verma who also contributed greatly in the foundation of the institute.

=== Nehru Science Complex and Naini ===
In 2000, before the construction of the Jhalwa campus, ten rooms located on the ground floor of the Nehru Science Complex in Allahabad University were given to IIIT-A following a memorandum of understanding (MOU) between the two institutes. At NSC, IIIT-A had five laboratories, eight computer labs, five lecture halls, and a library; which they vacated in 2011.

The first-year students used to be housed in a hostel situated in Naini Industrial Area (19 km (12 mi) away from the main campus), which had a regular bus service to Jhalwa, and from there to NSC. In 2011, after the institute's bus ran over and killed a freshman, students demanded immediate shifting of the inmates from Naini to Jhalwa, with provision of proper facilities including an ambulance (which the Naini hostel lacked), in addition to compensation for the deceased's family, and director M. D. Tiwari's resignation.

=== Rajiv Gandhi Institute of Information Technology ===
Rajiv Gandhi Institute of Information Technology (RGIIT) in Tikarmafi, Amethi (also called IIIT Amethi) was an off-campus centre of IIIT Allahabad, which was closed after a run of 11 years in 2016.

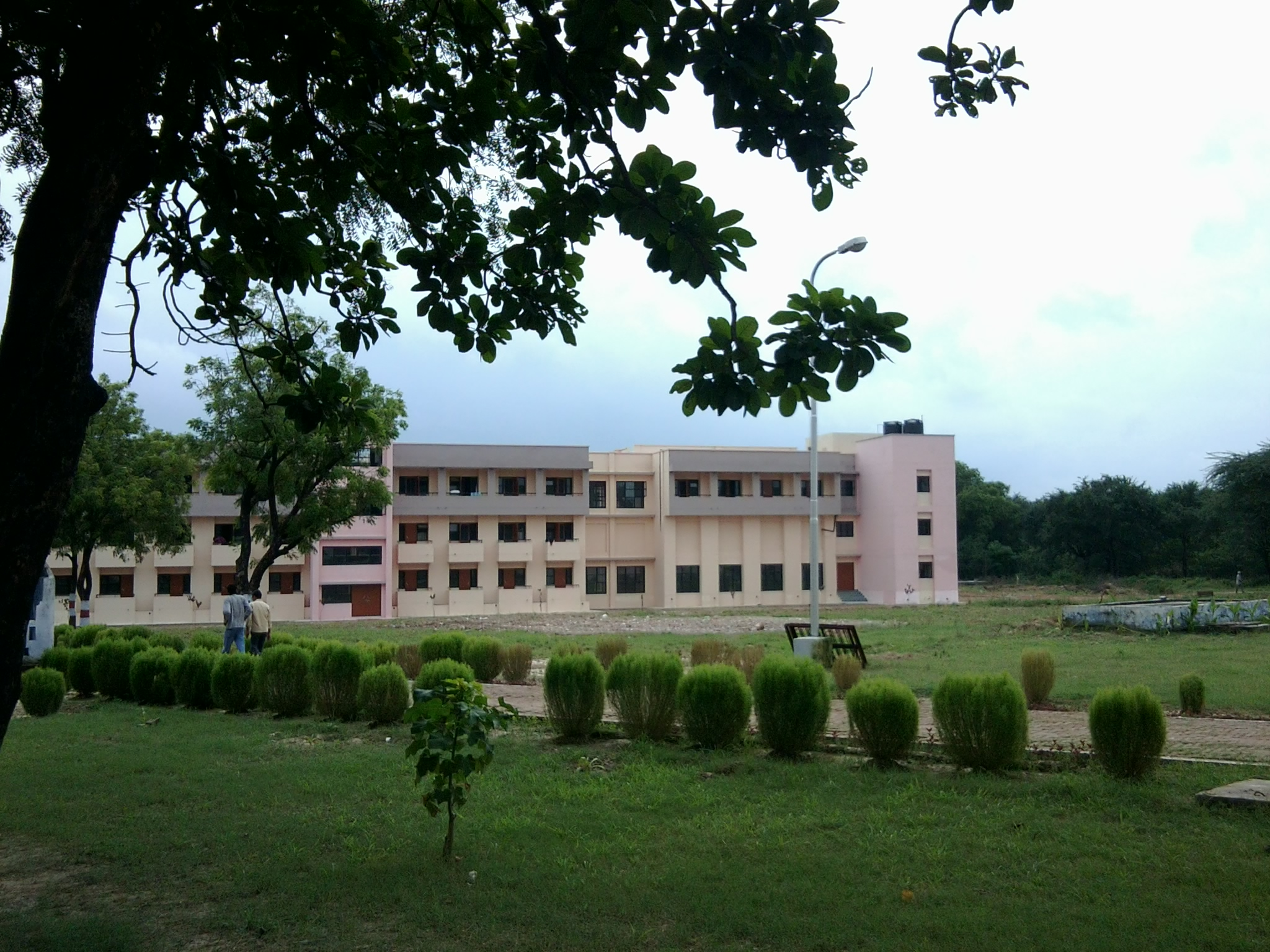
Former campus of RGIIT (IIIT Amethi), which is now BBAU Satellite Centre

148 students of the last batch of RGIIT were shifted to the Allahabad campus of IIIT-A, and the Amethi campus was transferred to Babaseheb Bhimrao Ambedkar University, Lucknow for opening a satellite institute.

Prakash Javadekar, HRD Minister at the time, justified the closure; mentioning that the campus was technically illegal as IIITs, under law, are not authorised to open extension centres. He added that the centre had no permanent faculty, and students were unhappy because of the inadequate facilities.

Indian National Congress leader and former Member of Parliament, in the Lok Sabha, from Amethi, Rahul Gandhi accused Narendra Modi, then prime minister, of indulging in "politics of vendetta" for the closure of RGIIT, along with several other projects in Amethi. Rahul Gandhi's pet project "Discovery Park" was one of them, which was opened by RGIIT in 2009 for research and development, under which resource sub-centres for agriculture technology were set up in nearby villages. The project was closed in 2014 due to "fund crunch", as the Union government's Department of Science and Technology had reportedly halted its monetary grant.

== Student life ==
The institute has a student body known as the Students' Gymkhana.

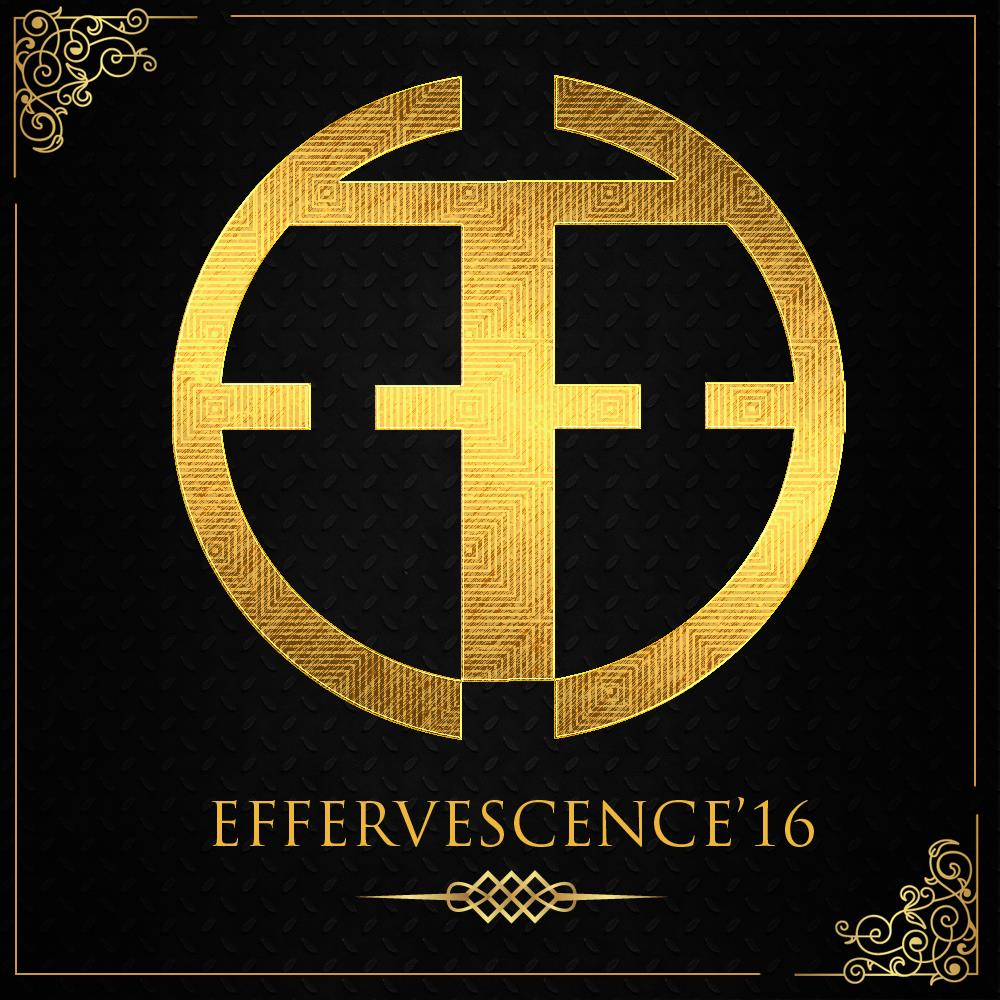
Effervescence'16 poster

Effervescence is the annual cultural festival of the institute. It lasts for three days and includes music, dance, drama, art, debate, photography, and other activities.

Aparoksha is the annual technical festival of the institute. It consists of a number of events like Hack In The North — the biggest student held hackathon of North India— and various coding, designing, cybersecurity, blockchain and robotics contests and workshops.

Asmita is the annual sports festival of the institute, in which tournaments for aquatics, athletics, cricket, football, volleyball, basketball, squash, table tennis, kabbadi, kho-kho, carrom, chess, and powerlifting are held.

The students and faculty members have also been engaged in helping the local community through various outreach programs like Unnat Bharat Abhiyan and Prayaas.

In 2025, the institute introduced new measures for students admitted under the Persons with Disabilities (PwD) category, to make the campus more accessible, following protests in the wake of deaths of two students— one of which was a death by suicide on campus, of a hearing and speech-impaired student. A Counselling Cell was formed to serve as a support system for addressing the academic, emotional, and social needs of students, especially those admitted under the PwD category. This initiative also aimed to tackle broader mental health challenges like stress, anxiety and depression.

A "Student-Administration Synergy Committee (SASC)" was also formed on a perpetual basis, composed of undergraduate and postgraduate students, research scholars and academic administrators, to establish a continuous dialogue between students and faculty members.

== Notable alumni ==
Name	Class Year	Notability	References
Harsha Suryanarayana	B.Tech. (IT), 2006	Top-ranked competitive programmer	
Captain Davinder Singh Jass	MBA, 2005-2007 (dropped out)	Kirti Chakra awardee	

== See also ==
- Biomedicine – Branch of medical science
- Cardiophysics
- Computational anatomy – Interdisciplinary field of biology
- Medical physics – Application of physics in medicine or healthcare
- Physiome – Wholistic physiological dynamics of an organism
