= Harsha Suryanarayana =

Indian programmer

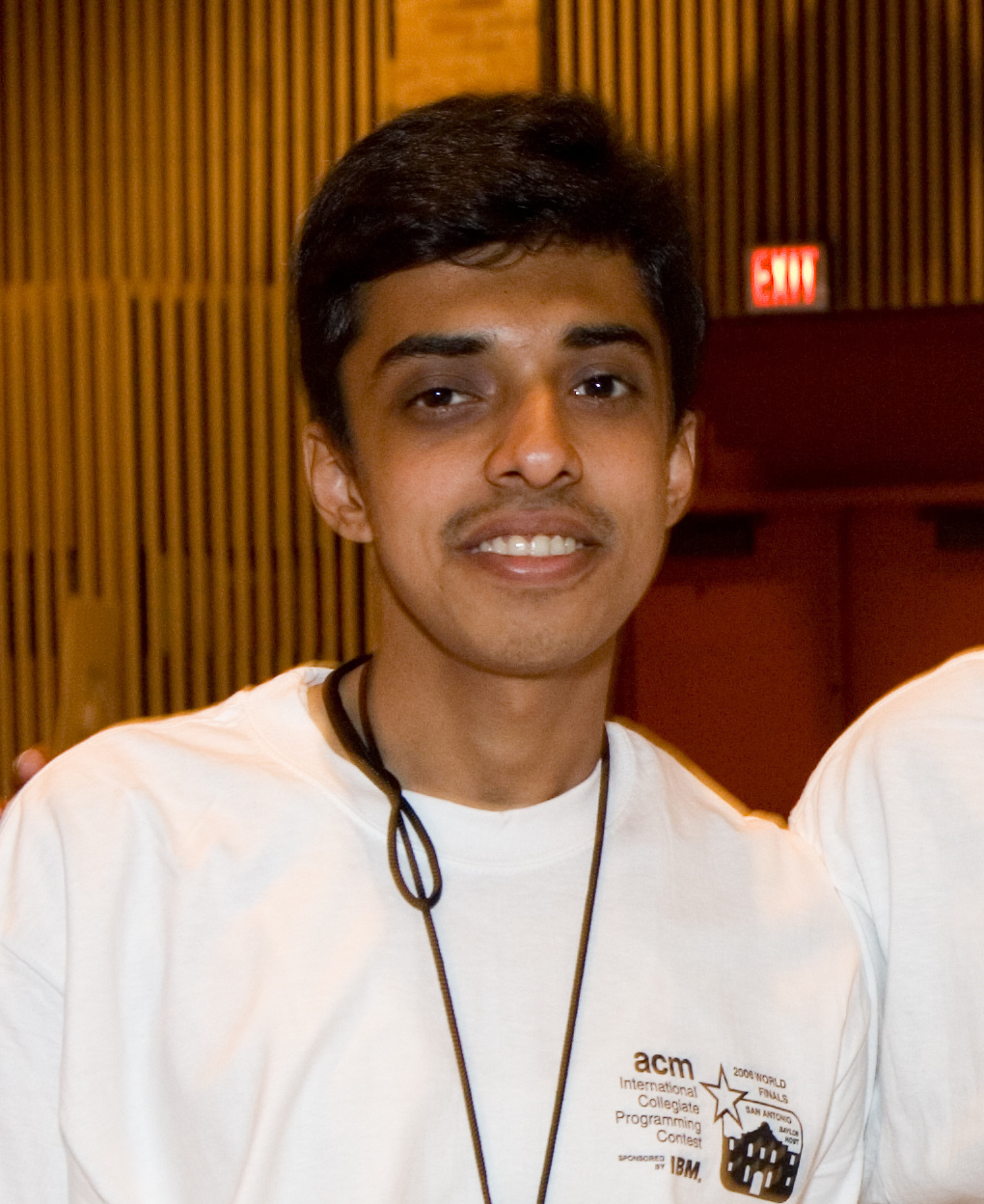
- Harsha Suryanarayana at the ACM-ICPC 2006 World Finals
- Born: 23 May 1984
- Died: 15 June 2014 (aged 30)
- Other name: Topcoder handle: humblefool
- Education: Indian Institute of Information Technology, Allahabad
- Known for: Various programming achievements

Harsha Suryanarayana (23 May 1984 – 15 June 2014), popularly known as "humblefool" in the coding community (after his username on Topcoder), was an Indian programmer who is often considered to be "India's greatest coder".

He was killed in a hit-and-run in 2014 at the age of 30.

== Education ==
Harsha S enrolled at Indian Institute of Information Technology, Allahabad in 2002, and graduated with a B.Tech. in Information Technology in 2006.

== Achievements ==
Harsha was among the top 20 finalists of "Code4Bill"; a contest conducted by Microsoft in 2006 which aimed at finding the best student programmers in India, with the winner getting an internship in Bill Gates' technical team.

He was also one of the three members of the team "IIIT AceofSpades" representing IIIT Allahabad in ACM-ICPC World Finals in 2006. They stood at the 62nd position, and received an Honorable Mention.

In 2008, Harsha became one of the first Indians to qualify for Google Code Jam World Finals. He ranked 31 in the Finals, which is the best performance by any Indian contestant till date.

A two-time Topcoder Open finalist, Harsha was one of India's first "red coders" on Topcoder; and was the highest rated Indian coder at the time of his death.

== Career ==
As a finalist of Microsoft's Code4Bill contest, Harsha worked as an intern at Microsoft Research India (MSRI). The following year (in 2007) he joined Microsoft Corporation and worked as a Research Developer. After a brief stint as a Designer for TopCoder in 2008, he worked in Tagle as a Technical Lead from 2008 to 2011.

In 2011, Harsha became one of the directors of Hungry Labs. He co-founded startups HungryDen in 2011 and JustReco in 2012. He was also running a project named Agile Design Labs, where he would teach software design to developers.

In 2013, Animesh Nayan (another alumnus of IIIT Allahabad), who used to teach programming through his YouTube channel "mycodeschool", reached out to Harsha and discussed the idea of teaching computer science and programming to masses through videos and online practice platform. The two then decided to work together and went through a startup accelerator for MyCodeSchool. As directors and mentors of MyCodeSchool, they organised coding boot camps for corporate training and for teaching competitive programming to computer science students.

== Death ==
On the night of 15 June 2014, as Harsha Suryanarayana and his wife Neha Gedela were walking towards their flat after buying fruits from a supermarket at Jalahalli in Bangalore, the driver of a speeding car lost control of the vehicle and hit the couple. Harsha was tossed up in air, fell down and sustained multiple severe injuries. Neha was thrown towards the pavement, and was also seriously injured. After the accident, the car driver fled the scene.

Harsha was killed on the spot. Neha survived; but she was unconscious for five hours, and had to spend eight hours in intensive care.

The driver of the vehicle was never found.

== Legacy ==
SRM 625, a Single Round Match held on 19 June 2014 on Topcoder, was dedicated to Harsha. June Monthly Challenge ("June-O!") on HackerEarth organised on 28 June 2014, was dedicated as a tribute to humblefool (Harsha). May Cook-Off 2015 on CodeChef was held on 24 May, a day after Harsha's birthday, as an homage.

In 2015, the programming laboratory for first year students in IIIT Allahabad (Harsha's alma mater) was dedicated in his name "so that many more talented students can get inspiration from him".

Amrita University organised Lord of the Code (LoC) marathon programming competition from February 2016 through November 2016, as a tribute to Harsha, who was fondly called "Lord Harsha" by his peers. The online contest, hosted on CodeChef, took place on the last four days of each month. The monthly winners received prizes in the name of Harsha Suryanarayana.

In March 2016, a coding contest called "Humblefool Cup" was organised as a part of Aparoksha, the technical fest of IIIT Allahabad, in memory of Harsha. It was conducted on CodeChef in 2016, but has been organised by TopCoder every year since 2017. Topcoder had also organised Humblefool Charity Hackathon in 2017 where the goal was to ideate, design and develop applications related to Programming Education, to help carry on the legacy of Harsha Suryanarayana.
