= Gayle Laakmann McDowell =

Consultant, coder, author and speaker

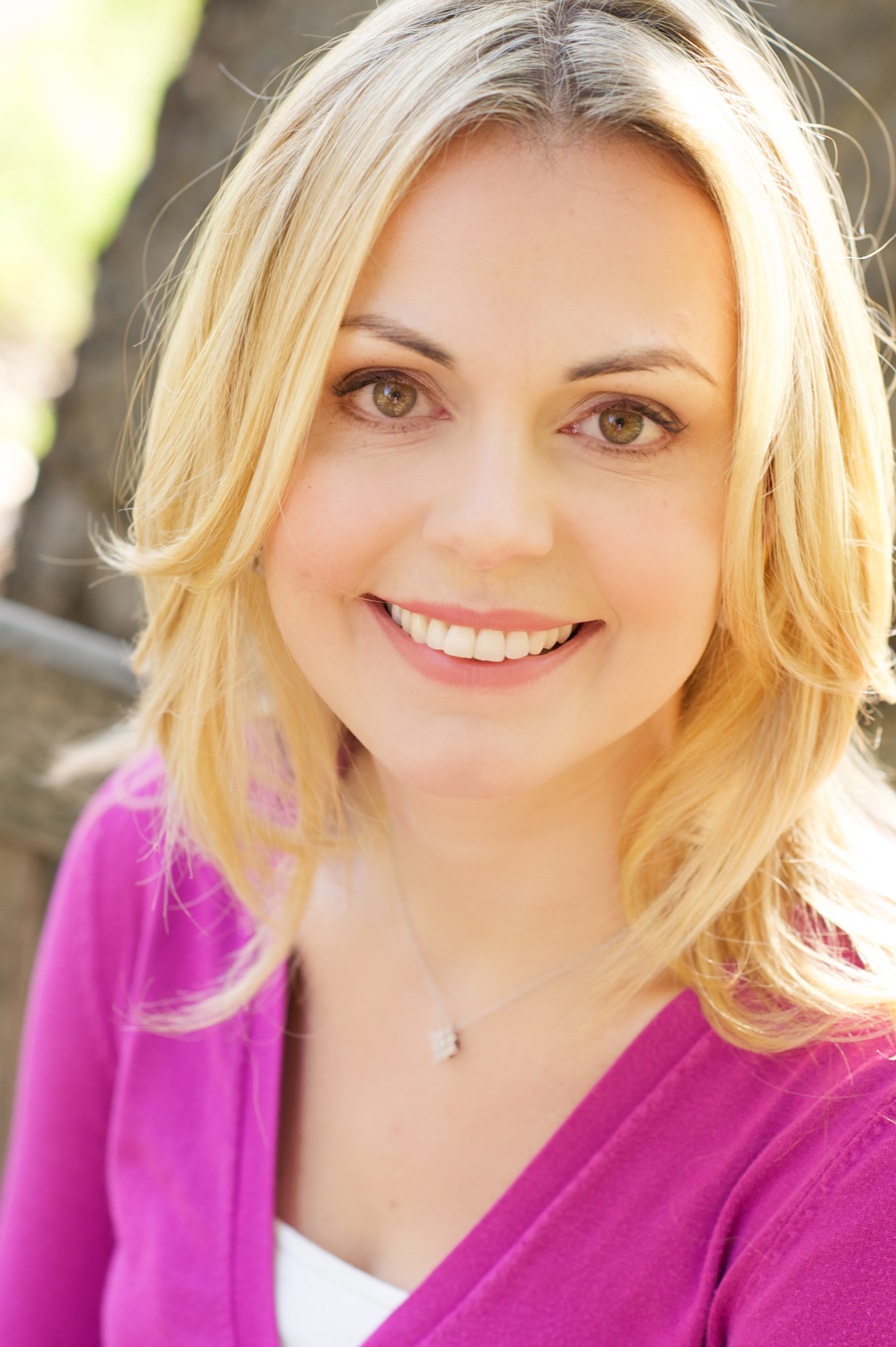
- Gayle Laakmann McDowell in 2014
- Born: Gayle Laakmann; 1982 (age 42–43)
- Education: Episcopal Academy
- Alma mater: University of Pennsylvania (BSE, MSE); Wharton School (MBA)
- Known for: Cracking the Coding Interview
- Scientific career
- Fields: Recruitment; Coding interviews Computer science Career development Software engineering
- Institutions: Apple; Google; Microsoft; CareerCup
- Website: www.gayle.com

Gayle Laakmann McDowell (born 1982) is a software engineer and author. She is the lead author of the career development series of books: Cracking the X.

== Education ==
McDowell was educated at the Episcopal Academy and the University of Pennsylvania where she was received a Bachelor of Science in Engineering (BSE) and Master of Engineering (MSE) degrees in Computer Science in 2005.

== Career ==
Cracking the Coding Interview cover

After working as a software engineer for Google she joined a small venture capital-funded startup company as the Vice President (VP) of engineering before being awarded a Master of Business Administration (MBA) degree from the Wharton School of the University of Pennsylvania. McDowell subsequently founded her own business, CareerCup.com, which helps people prepare for interviews at big tech companies.

First self-published in 2008, her book Cracking the Coding Interview provides guidance on technical job interviews, and includes solutions to example coding interview questions. A followup was published in 2025 covering issues in recruitment, job hunting and behavioral interviews alongside material on big O notation, leetcode, algorithms and data structures called Beyond Cracking the Coding Interview.

McDowell has also co-authored the books Cracking the PM Interview (for product managers: PMs), Cracking the PM career and Cracking the Tech Career. Mainstream media coverage of her work include articles in The New York Times, The Guardian, The Wall Street Journal, USA Today, U.S. News & World Report, and Fast Company.

McDowell gave the commencement speech at the University of Pennsylvania School of Engineering and Applied Science Masters graduation in 2016.
