= Turakhia =

Turakhia is a surname. Notable people with the surname include:

- Bhavin Turakhia (born 1979), Indian entrepreneur
- Divyank Turakhia (born 1982), Indian-born computer-programmer
