= CodeChef =

Global Programming education platform

- Website type: Competitive programming
- Founded: September 2009
- Headquarters: Bangalore, {{{location_country}}}
- Industry: kino
- Website: www.codechef.com

CodeChef is a competitive programming contests platform that endeavours to empower learners to master coding through structured courses, practice problems, and regular contests. It offers entry-level paths in languages like Python, C++, and Java, along with advanced tracks in data structures, algorithms, and web development. For educational institutions, CodeChef provides integrated lab modules and mobile content-enabled courseware that can be embedded into lectures, labs, or homework assignments.

CodeChef competes with similar educational technology companies such as LeetCode, HackerRank, SPOJ, Topcoder, and GeeksforGeeks.

== History ==
It began as an educational initiative in 2009 by Directi, an Indian software company. In 2020, it was purchased by Unacademy.

In 2010, Directi launched CodeChef to help programmers improve their problem-solving skills through active participation in programming contests. The goal was to strengthen problem-solving skills by fostering friendly competition and community engagement. In July of that year, the organization introduced the "Go for Gold" initiative, enabling Indian teams to excel at the world finals of the International Collegiate Programming Contest (formerly known as ACM-ICPC).

In July 2013, Directi launched the "CodeChef for Schools" program to encourage school students to participate in programming. The initiative hopes to enable Indian students to excel at the International Olympiad in Informatics (IOI). The competition requires contestants to show necessary IT skills such as problem analysis, algorithm and data structure design, programming, and testing.

In November 2017, the first CodeChef Certification exam was conducted. The platform has also been used by businesses for technical hiring, employer branding, and developer adoption needs.

In addition to monthly coding contests, CodeChef had initiatives for schools, colleges and women in competitive programming. It hosted the India regionals of the ICPC for college students, as well as for the International Olympiad in Informatics (IOI) for school students in India.

In 2020, its ownership was changed from Directi to Unacademy.

After failing to reach profitability, Unacademy announced it would retain a 30% stake in CodeChef while returning the remaining equity to the company's founding team to support further growth.

Starting 2023, CodeChef operates as an independent company owned and run by its independent management team and employees.
