= Davinder Singh Jass =

Indian army officer

Captain Davinder Singh Jass KC
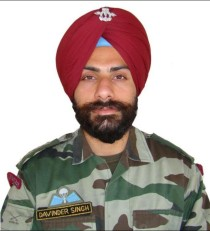
- Born: 29 September 1983; Ghaziabad, Uttar Pradesh, India
- Died: 23 February 2010 (aged 26); Sopore, Jammu and Kashmir
- Education: GLA University (BTech); IIIT Allahabad (MBA; unfinished); Indian Military Academy
- Military career
- Allegiance: Republic of India
- Branch: Indian Army
- Service years: 2007–2010
- Rank: Captain
- Service number: IC-70151W
- Unit: 1 Para (SF)
- Awards: Kirti Chakra

Captain Davinder Singh Jass KC (29 September 1983 – 23 February 2010) was an Indian Army officer of 1 Para (Special Forces). He was posthumously awarded the Kirti Chakra, India's second highest peacetime military decoration.

== Early life and education ==
Davinder Singh Jass was born on 29 September 1983 to Dalbir Kaur and Bhupinder Singh Jass, a former general manager of Dabur India, in Ghaziabad, Uttar Pradesh. He had an elder sister Harpreet Kaur Jass, who is a professor in Jamia Millia Islamia.

After his schooling in Guru Harkrishan Public School, India Gate, New Delhi, he got a BTech in Computer Science from GLA University, Mathura. He then enrolled for an MBA in IIIT Allahabad in 2005. He had secured a job at Deloitte, but after qualifying to join the army on his second attempt, he joined the Indian Military Academy, just a few months before getting his MBA degree.

== Military career ==
Jass was commissioned into Corps of Signals on 10 December 2007. He was inducted into the elite 1 Parachute Regiment in January 2009, and he successfully cleared his probation on 11 April 2009. He was later posted to Kupwara in Jammu and Kashmir in November 2009.

== Sopore encounter ==
On 22 February 2010, the security forces received information from intelligence sources about the presence of militants in the Chinkipora area in Sopore in Baramulla district. In the wee hours of 23 February 2010, the Army, the CRPF, and the Jammu and Kashmir police, launched a joint search operation.

As they initiated a house-to-house search, the militants hiding in three houses opened fire, triggering a gun battle at about 5:30 am. Captain Jass, leading his team, tried to force his way into one of the houses. The militants lobbed grenades, after which the army lost contact with the officer. Later when a fellow officer contacted his mobile phone, the militants picked it up; and when offered a safe passage for his release, they said that he had already been killed. The official statement of both the army and the police was that Jass was not taken captive and was killed fighting the militants.

The encounter ended after nearly 15 hours; the Captain's body couldn't be retrieved till late in the evening. Other than Captain Jass, two soldiers of 1 Para, Naik Selva Kumar and paratrooper Imtiaz Ahmad Thoker, were also killed. They both were posthumously awarded the Sena Medal. Among the slain militants, there were one each from Lashkar-e-Taiba and Hizbul Mujahideen, two from Harkat-ul-Mujahideen, and one was a local militant.

== Kirti Chakra ==
Captain Jass was awarded the Kirti Chakra, India's second highest peace-time military honour on 15 August, 2010; and it was presented to him on 18 March 2011, at the Defence Investiture Ceremony, at Rashtrapati Bhavan, in New Delhi. His mother Dalbir Kaur received the honour for her deceased son from the President of India, Pratibha Patil.

IC-70151 CAPTAIN DAVINDER SINGH JASS, 1ST BATTALION THE PARACHUTE REGIMENT (SPECIAL FORCES) (POSTHUMOUS)
(Effective date of the award: 23 February 2010)

Captain Davinder Singh Jass was leading his troop of Alfa Team in an operation in a village in Sopore district of Jammu & Kashmir.

On 23 February 2010, after receiving information of presence of terrorists in the village, a heavily congested built up area, Captain Davinder Singh Jass after carrying out meticulous planning moved to the area. While closing into the target area his leading squad came under heavy indiscriminate terrorist fire from multiple directions, injuring members of his squad. With utter disregard to personal safety he extricated one of his injured men to safety. Thereafter, the officer crawled forward and extricated the second buddy, however he sustained serious gun shot wounds. Unmindful of injuries, he continued engaging the terrorists and closed in to a terrorist. In a daring encounter he killed one terrorist in a fierce hand to hand combat before succumbing to his injuries.

— Gazette of India Notification,

== Legacy ==
After the Captain's death, a road was named after him in Indirapuram, the neighbourhood in Ghaziabad where his family lives, by the initiative of Trans Hindon residents’ association. There is also a gateway or ‘dwar’ outside their housing society, with his picture and name; which was built with the help of politician Amarpal Sharma. In January 2023, Gen V. K. Singh (Retd) inaugurated a badminton and volleyball court in Nagar Nigam Balika Inter College, Indirapuram (Ghaziabad), constructed by Shaheed Captain Davinder Singh Jass Memorial Trust in the Captain's name.
