= 98.0 FM =

FM radio frequency

The following radio stations broadcast on FM frequency 98.0 MHz:

== China ==
- CNR Business Radio in Tianjin and Zibo
- CNR Radio The Greater Bay in Guangzhou
- CNR The Voice of China in Jilin City

== Malaysia ==
- Era in Kuantan, Pahang

== Macau ==
- TDM Portuguese Radio

== Russia ==
- Kino FM in Moscow

== Singapore ==
- Power 98 in Singapore

== United Kingdom ==
- BBC Radio 1 in Calder Valley, Campbeltown, Carmarthenshire, Colwyn Bay, Hebden Bridge, Isle of Man, Kenley, Peebles, Pontypridd, South Wales, West Yorkshire
- BBC Three Counties Radio in High Wycombe
- Phoenix FM in Brentwood
- Ujima Radio in Bristol
