= Platial =

Former website providing map services

Platial, Inc.
- Company type: Private
- Available in: English
- Founded: 2004
- Headquarters: Portland, Oregon, {{{location_country}}}
- Area served: Worldwide
- Founders: Di-Ann Eisnor, Jake Olsen, Jason Wilson
- Key people: Di-Ann Eisnor, cofounder and CEO; Jake Olsen, cofounder and CTO; Jason Wilson, cofounder and VP of Product
- Industry: Software
- Products: Mapmaker, Mapkit, Slider
- Revenue: Contextual Advertising
- Website: www.platial.com
- Registration: Optional
- Launched: 2004
- Current status: Dead

Platial was a collaborative, user generated, cartographic website. It was founded in 2004 by Di-Ann Eisnor, Jake Olsen, and Jason Wilson. Platial, Inc. was headquartered in Portland, Oregon.

Platial was used by hundreds of thousands of people globally to share and associate relevant content with geographic places of interest. Platial claims 25% of the web's map widgets, used on over 10,000 sites.

On October 18, 2007, Platial acquired Frappr!, another social mapping website, increasing its total user-generated locations to more than 100 million.

On February 27, 2010 Platial announced that the service would be closing down within a few days.

In the Geographic Information Science literature, the concept of 'platial' refers to place-based studies in parallel with the use of 'spatial' for space-based (coordinate-system oriented) studies.
