= Bhavin Turakhia =

Indian businessman

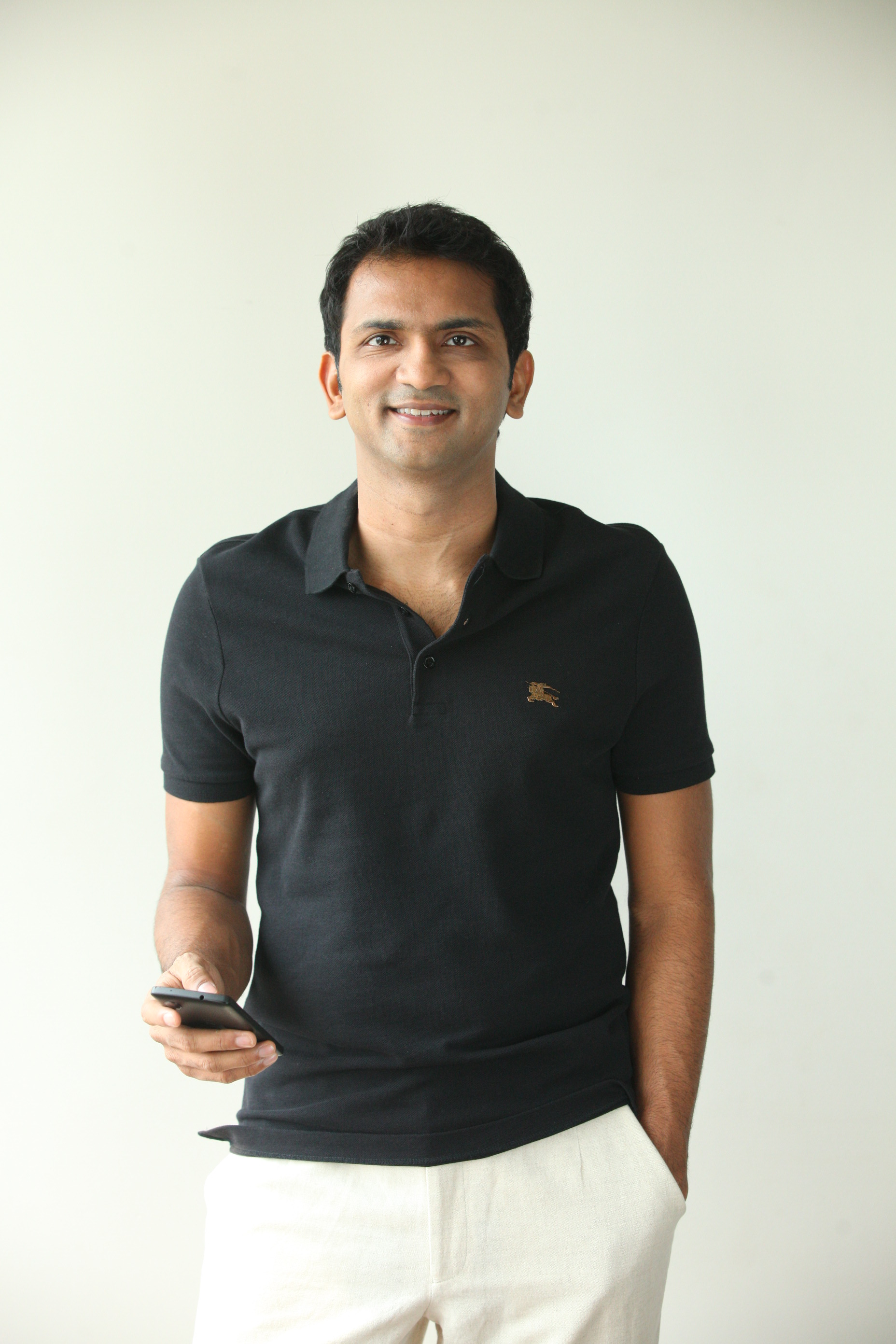
- Bhavin Turakhia
- Born: 21 December 1979 (age 46); Mumbai, Maharashtra, India
- Education: Arya Vidya Mandir; D. G. Ruparel College of Arts, Science and Commerce; Sydenham College of Commerce and Economics
- Occupations: CEO & founder of Directi, Titan, Flock, Radix and Ringo; Co-founder of Zeta
- Known for: Directi, Titan, Radix, Ringo, Flock, Zeta, CodeChef, and Neo

Bhavin Turakhia (born 21 December 1979), is an entrepreneur, and the founder of Titan, Flock, Radix, CodeChef, Zeta and Neo. In 2016, Bhavin, a billionaire, was ranked as the 95th richest person in India, along with his brother Divyank Turakhia, according to Forbes. He was a 2011 Young Global Leader by the World Economic Forum.

== Early life ==
Bhavin was born in Mumbai in a middle-class Jain family. He did his schooling from Arya Vidya Mandir, Bandra. He attended D.G. Ruparel College to study science and later dropped out. He completed his bachelor's degree in commerce from Sydenham College of Commerce and Economics. As of 2017, he is based in London.

== Career ==
In 1998, at the age of 18 and with a capital of ₹25,000 (equal to roughly US$675 in 1998), Bhavin Turakhia started his first tech venture Directi with his brother Divyank Turakhia.

In 2014, Bhavin and Divyank sold four of their web companies – BigRock, LogicBoxes, Reseller Club, and Webhosting.info – to web-hosting firm Endurance International Group for $160 million.

In July 2019, his banking tech venture Zeta received an investment from Sodexo at a valuation of $300 million. In 2021, Zeta secured $250 million in investment from SoftBank Vision Fund 2. This Series C investment values Zeta at $1.45 billion.

In August 2021, Titan, the professional email service founded by Bhavin, received a $30 million investment from Automattic, valuing Titan at $300 million.

As of 2026, Bhavin operates companies Titan, Flock, Radix, Zeta and Neo.

== Awards and recognition ==
- Ranked #95, with a net worth of US$1.3 billion, on the Forbes list of India's 100 Richest People (2016).
- Serial Entrepreneur of the Year and Entrepreneur of the Year in Innovation and Technology by Entrepreneur (2016).
- The ETPanache Trendsetter Award by The Economic Times (2016).
- Young Global Leader by the World Economic Forum (WEF) in Geneva (2011).
- Bharti Entrepreneur of the Year award by the Bharti Foundation & the Entrepreneurship Development Institute of India (2005).
- Chairperson of the Internet Corporation for Assigned Names and Numbers (ICANN)'s Registrar Constituency for several terms.
- Mentioned as one of the first Indian dotcom founders of the 21^{st} century

== See also ==
- List of Indian entrepreneurs
- List of Internet entrepreneurs
