= Paige Craig =

American venture capitalist

- Born: 1975 (age 50–51)
- Education: University of Maryland, National University
- Occupations: Venture capitalist, Entrepreneur
- Organization: Outlander

Paige Craig (born 1974) is a venture capitalist and general partner at Outlander, a founder-focused, seed stage venture capital firm he founded in 2014 and based in New York and San Francisco. The firm manages over a billion dollars in assets and notable investments include SpaceX, Twitter, Lyft, Gusto, Scale, Wish and more.

Before entering venture capital, Craig served in the United States Marine Corps and later the US Intelligence Community. During his time he served in the Middle East and Asia

He later founded the Lincoln Group in 2003 and launched it by driving into Iraq at the start of the war and building one of the largest defense startups and private military companies in the world. He In 2014 he sold the company to Constellis and later Apollo Global in a billion dollar deal.

== Early life and education ==
He began his career in the military in 1992, where he went to West Point, ultimately becoming a cadet. In 1995, he dropped out of West Point and enlisted in the United States Marine Corps with his time in the Marines strongly influencing the development of his '38 principles for investment' He got his undergraduate in Information Technology from the University of Maryland, later earning an M.B.A from National University.

== Career ==
Craig enlisted in the Marines and was promoted to sergeant before leaving the service in 2000. After the Invasion of Iraq in 2003, he created the Lincoln Group and started winning Pentagon contracts to assist with "psychological operations".

He became an angel investor and later a VC to over 200 startups from 2008 to present day. He acquired an early-stage portfolio that included Airbnb, Lyft, AngelList, Postmates, and Klout.

Craig currently leads Outlander Ventures (formerly known as Arena).
