= Kino =

Kino means cinema or film in many European languages.

Kino may also refer to:

== Arts, entertainment and media ==
=== Broadcasters ===
- KINO, a radio station in Arizona, U.S.
- Kino FM, a Russian music radio station
- KinoTV, now Ruutu+ Leffat ja Sarjat, a Finnish TV channel

=== In fiction ===
- Operation Kino, in the 2009 film Inglourious Basterds
- Kino Asakura, in the anime series Shaman King
- Himari Kino, in the manga and anime series Whisper Me a Love Song
- Karen Kino, in the manga series Kaguya-sama wa Kokurasetai
- Makoto Kino, in the manga and anime series Sailor Moon
- Kino, in the light novel series Kino's Journey
- Kino, a character in the video game Chrono Trigger
- Kino, in John Steinbeck's short story The Pearl
- Kino der Toten, a zombies map in the video game Call of Duty: Black Ops
- Kino, a TikTok-like short form video app in the 2026 film Faces of Death

=== Film and television ===
- Stargate Universe Kino, webisodes associated with the TV series
- Kino Lorber, film distributor

=== Music ===
- Kino (band), a Soviet rock group
- Kino (British band), a neo-progressive rock band
- "Kino", a song by Nena from the 1984 album 99 Luftballons
- "Kino", a song by The Knife from the 2001 album The Knife
- "Kino", a 1992 song by Cabaret Voltaire

== People ==
- Kino (singer) (Kang Hyung-gu, born 1998), from South Korean boy group Pentagon
- Eusebio Kino (1644–1711), or Father Kino, Jesuit missionary
- Gordon S. Kino (1928–2017), Australian-British-American inventor, electrical engineer, and applied physicist
- Kazuyoshi Kino (紀野 一義; 1922–2013), Japanese Buddhist scholar
- Minoru Kino (木野 実; born 1945), Japanese handball player
- Nanami Kino (紀野 奈々美; born 1955), Japanese handball player
- Kino MacGregor (born 1977), American yoga teacher and author

== Places ==
- Bahía Kino (Kino Bay), Mexico
- Kino, Kentucky, U.S.
- Kino Station, a train station in Sakyō-ku, Kyoto, Japan

== Other uses ==
- Kino (botany), an exudate produced by various trees and other plants
- Kino (movement), a film-making movement founded in 1999
- Kino (software), a video editing application
- Kino Indonesia, an Indonesian consumer goods company

== See also ==
- Keno, a lottery-like gambling game
- Jino, an ethnic group in China
- Pterocarpus erinaceus, African kino tree
- Pterocarpus marsupium, Indian kino tree or Malabar kino
