= Media.net =

Contextual advertising network

- Founded: 2010
- Founder: Divyank Turakhia

Media.net is a contextual advertising network. On August 21, 2016, Miteno Communication Technology (also known as Shuzhi.AI), a Chinese consortium, acquired Media.net for US$900 million.

The company has over 800 employees across North America, Asia, and Europe. It has its headquarters in New York and its global headquarters in Dubai.

== History ==
Media.net was founded in 2010 by Indian entrepreneur Divyank Turakhia. In its early years, the company partnered with Yahoo! and the Bing search network to provide contextual advertising services for web publishers. By the mid-2010s, Media.net had grown into a major player in the contextual advertising space, with offices and staff across North America, Asia, and the Middle East.

In 15 October 2018, Divyank Turakhia moved into an advisory role, and Vaibhav Arya became the CEO of Media.net. Furthermore, in June 2020, Media.net became a member of the IAB Tech Lab Board of Directors, and its Senior Vice President of Business Operations, Karan Dalal, joined the board. This reflects the company’s role in industry standardizaion and global advertising technology. By 2016, Media.net managed about US$450 million in annual advertising revenue, with around 90% of that coming from the U.S. market. In 2015, Media.net reported revenues of about US$232 million, more than half of which came from mobile advertising. Also, In April 2022, Media.net partnered with NewsGuard to help brands advertise responsibly on news websites, supporting efforts in brand safety and contextual advertising.
