= Algorithmic Puzzles =

- First edition
- Author: Anany Levitin, Maria Levitin
- Publisher: Oxford University Press
- Publication date: 2011

Algorithmic Puzzles is a book of puzzles based on computational thinking. It was written by computer scientists Anany and Maria Levitin, and published in 2011 by Oxford University Press.

== Topics ==
The book begins with a "tutorial" introducing classical algorithm design techniques including backtracking, divide-and-conquer algorithms, and dynamic programming, methods for the analysis of algorithms, and their application in example puzzles. The puzzles themselves are grouped into three sets of 50 puzzles, in increasing order of difficulty. A final two chapters provide brief hints and more detailed solutions to the puzzles, with the solutions forming the majority of pages of the book.

Some of the puzzles are well known classics, some are variations of known puzzles making them more algorithmic, and some are new. They include:

- Puzzles involving chessboards, including the eight queens puzzle, knight's tours, and the mutilated chessboard problem
- Balance puzzles
- River crossing puzzles
- The Tower of Hanoi
- Finding the missing element in a data stream
- The geometric median problem for Manhattan distance

== Audience and reception ==
The puzzles in the book cover a wide range of difficulty, and in general do not require more than a high school level of mathematical background. William Gasarch notes that grouping the puzzles only by their difficulty and not by their themes is actually an advantage, as it provides readers with fewer clues about their solutions.

Reviewer Narayanan Narayanan recommends the book to any puzzle aficionado, or to anyone who wants to develop their powers of algorithmic thinking. Reviewer Martin Griffiths suggests another group of readers, schoolteachers and university instructors in search of examples to illustrate the power of algorithmic thinking. Gasarch recommends the book to any computer scientist, evaluating it as "a delight".
