= CodeSignal =

Assessment software

- Type: Private
- Industry: Software, Technology, Education
- Founded: 2015
- Founders: Tigran Sloyan, Aram Shatakhtsyan, Felix Desroches
- Headquarters: San Francisco, California, U.S.
- Area served: Worldwide
- Products: CodeSignal Hire, CodeSignal Learn
- Website: codesignal.com

CodeSignal is a technology company that provides a skills assessment and development platform for organizations and individuals. Founded in 2015 and headquartered in San Francisco, California, the company was launched under the name CodeFights, and was renamed in 2018.

== History ==
CodeSignal was founded in 2015 by Tigran Sloyan, Aram Shatakhtsyan, and Felix Desroches. Initially launched as CodeFights, it began as a platform for competitive programming challenges, allowing users to compete in head-to-head timed coding battles.

In 2017, CodeFights introduced an interview practice mode, helping users prepare for technical interviews with practice questions and assessments. In 2018, the company rebranded to CodeSignal to reflect its shift towards providing assessment tools for technical recruiting and introduced the Coding Score, a standardized measure for developers to showcase their coding abilities to potential employers.

In October 2020, CodeSignal announced that it had raised $25 million in a Series B funding round led by Menlo Ventures, with participation from existing investors including Capital One Ventures and CM Ventures. The funding was aimed at expanding the company's technical assessment platform and scaling its team.

In September 2021, CodeSignal secured $50 million in a Series C funding round led by Index Ventures, with additional participation from Menlo Ventures and Headline. The company stated that the funds would be used to further develop its technical assessment solutions and invest in research and development.

== Products and services ==
CodeSignal offers a suite of assessment and educational tools designed to evaluate and improve skills.

The company's assessment platform provides advanced task-based simulations, standardized coding tests, and a real-world coding environment. These assessments are used by companies as part of their hiring processes.

In 2024, CodeSignal launched CodeSignal Learn. The platform includes an AI learning assistant called "Cosmo", which is derived from existing LLMs, such as ChatGPT.

In October 2024, CodeSignal released the AI Benchmarking Report which compared the coding skills of several AI models with those of human software engineers. According to CodeSignal, while AI models demonstrated impressive capabilities in solving coding tasks, top-performing human candidates still outperformed them in both average score and solve rate.

CodeSignal also publishes an annual University Ranking Report, which ranks American universities based on the performance of their students in CodeSignal's General Coding Assessment.

== See also ==
- Skill
- Coding interview
- Computer Programming
