= Zeta (company) =

Indian banking tech company, founded 2015

- Company type: Privately held company
- Founded: 2015
- Headquarters: San Francisco, California
- Area served: US, EMEA, Asia
- Founders: Bhavin Turakhia; Ramki Gaddipati
- Key people: Bhavin Turakhia (CEO); Ramki Gaddipati (CTO); Karla Booe (CCO); Gary Singh (President, US); Sivaram Kowta (President, India)
- Industry: Banking technology
- Products: Credit processing platform, Digital Credit as a Service
- Revenue: ▲₹893 crore (US$93 million) (FY24)
- Net income: ▲₹119 crore (US$12 million) (FY24)
- Employees: 1700+
- Parent: Zeta Services Inc.
- Website: www.zeta.tech
- Commercial: Yes
- Registration: Required
- Current status: Online

Zeta is a banking software company that was founded by Bhavin Turakhia and Ramki Gaddipati in 2015. The company provides credit and debit card issuer processing, BNPL, core banking and "mobile experiences". Zeta provides its products to banks and fintechs.

The company achieved unicorn status in 2021.

== History ==
The company was founded in April 2015 by Bhavin Turakhia and Ramki Gaddipati. Its initial offerings were for employee tax benefits, automated cafeterias, employee gifting, and digital payments. In 2016, Bhavin Turakhia invested around $19 million into Zeta. Initially, Zeta payments were only supported by the MasterCard network, but later the company also tied up with the National Payments Corporation of India's RuPay.

In June 2017, the company invested 5–10 crore to buy a minority stake in an HR company called ZingHR.

Zeta bought a minority stake in PeopleStrong in January 2018. In 2020, Zeta launched its technology platform-as-a-service in the Philippines and Vietnam with Sodexo being its first client in these countries.

Zeta launched its digital credit as a service in 2024 built on the NPCI's Credit Line on UPI (CLOU) for Indian banks.

The company operates in North America, the United Kingdom, Brazil, the Philippines, Italy, Spain, and Vietnam. Its headquarters are in San Francisco, California, and it has offices in India and Dubai.

== Funding ==
In 2019, Zeta received an investment from Sodexo BRS at a valuation of $300 million and this unit also merged with Zeta's employee benefits business.

In 2021, Zeta secured a Series C investment of $250 million from SoftBank Vision Fund 2 valuing Zeta at $1.45 billion. In March 2022, Zeta secured an additional $30 million from Mastercard at a valuation of $1.5 billion. In February 2025, Zeta received $50 million from a strategic investor at a valuation of $2 billion.

== Products ==
=== Tachyon ===
Zeta Tachyon is a credit processing platform for banks that provides services related to credit card issuance, core payments, BNPL loans, fraud and risk, and rewards with managed services.

==== Digital Credit as a Service ====
Digital Credit as a Service provides credit origination, issuance, and collections services to banks based on the National Payments Corporation of India's (NPCI) Credit Line on Unified Payments Interface(UPI). In 2024, Zeta claimed that it processes 2 million transactions every day.

== See also ==
- Neobank
- Sodexo
- Paytm
- FreeCharge
