= GLA University =

Private university in Uttar Pradesh, India

Coordinates: 27.605689°N 77.593325°E

- University Logo
- Other names: GLA University, Mathura
- Motto: ऋते ज्ञानान्न मुक्ति
- Motto in English: Without knowledge there is no salvation
- Type: Private
- Established: 2010; 16 years ago
- Accreditation: NAAC (A+ Grade)
- Affiliations: UGC
- Visitor: Chief Minister of Uttar Pradesh
- Chancellor: Narayan Das Agrawal
- Vice-Chancellor: Anup Kumar Gupta
- Academic staff: 850 +
- Administrative staff: 246
- Students: 24,000 +
- Location: Mathura, Uttar Pradesh, India
- Campus: 110 acres (45 ha); Rural (Mathura) Urban (Greater Noida)
- Website: gla.ac.in

GLA University is a private university in Mathura, Uttar Pradesh. It is recognized by University Grants Commission (UGC), National Council for Teacher Education and Pharmacy Council of India. It has been accredited by the National Assessment and Accreditation Council (NAAC) with 'A+' Grade.

== Rankings ==
The university was ranked 53rd in India by the NIRF (National Institutional Ranking Framework) in the pharmacy ranking and 151–200 overall in 2024.

University rankings

== See also ==
- University in India
- Education in India
- Higher education in India
- University Grants Commission (India)
