= Lincoln Group =

US defense contractor

The Lincoln Group (formerly known as Iraqex) is a defunct Washington, D.C.–based defense contractor. The firm was hired by the United States military to perform public relations (PR) in Iraq during the Iraq War. In 2005, the Los Angeles Times revealed the company had been paying for news stories in Iraqi newspapers.

== Background ==
According to the group's website, "Lincoln Alliance Corporation, with the assistance of a cadre of investors, formed Lincoln Group to pursue private sector opportunities in Iraq. Lincoln Group brings a unique combination of expertise in collecting and exploiting information; structuring transactions; and mitigating risks through due diligence and legal strategies."

In September 2004, the major PR contract for the Multi-National Corps – Iraq (MNC-I) was awarded to Iraqex, a "business clearinghouse company formed specifically to provide a swath of services in the war-torn country." The Washington, D.C.–based Lincoln Alliance Corporation, a "business 'intelligence' company that handles services from 'political campaign intelligence' to commercial real estate in Iraq", set up Iraqex the previous year. Iraqex had four Iraq offices, including in Baghdad and Basra. Iraqex was contracted to develop video and print publications, purchase TV and radio time, and oversee public affairs and advertising for MNC-I, to ensure "that the Coalition gains widespread Iraqi acceptance of its core themes and messages."

Iraqex subsequently changed its name to Lincoln Group, in line with the name of its holding company, Lincoln Alliance Corporation. Lincoln Group had a $6 million, three-year public relations contract for the MNC-I, for which it developed "video, audio and print products to support MNC-I initiatives." It also published Iraq Business Journal, a "monthly publication on contract opportunities, life in Iraq and classifieds." The publication ostensibly interviewed Grand Ayatollah Ali al-Sistani, who said foreign investment is acceptable, as long as the investor is not with the "occupation forces" or taking "advantage of any instability."^{(subscription required)}

== Pentagon contract 2005 ==
A June 11, 2005, Washington Post article reported that the Pentagon had awarded three contracts, potentially worth up to $300 million over five years, to three companies that it hoped would inject more creativity into its psychological operations efforts to improve foreign public opinion about the United States, particularly the military. Lincoln Group won one of the three contracts; Science Applications International Corporation and SYColeman, Inc., a subsidiary of L-3 Communications, won the other two. All three companies declined to comment for the article.

The Richmond Times-Dispatch wrote, "The use of contractors in psyops is a new wrinkle. But psychological warfare expert Herb Friedman said he is not surprised. ... With only one active-duty and two reserve psyops units remaining, Friedman said, 'The bottom line is, they don't have the manpower.'"

In September 2005, the Lincoln Group was looking to hire "senior media and PR professionals to guide an advertising and PR campaign to inform the Iraqi people of 'the Coalition's goals and to gain their support", according to O'Dwyer's. The firm also was recruiting "polling and trend analysis pros to analyze media and compile statistics with the Iraq Centre for Research and Strategic Studies." The new hires were due to an "ongoing expansion."^{(subscription required)}

== Paying for news in Iraq ==
In November 2005, the Los Angeles Times reported that the Lincoln Group was helping the Pentagon covertly place pro-United States stories in Iraqi news outlets. "Dozens" of pieces written by U.S. military "information operations" troops were placed during 2005, according to the Times. "The operation is designed to mask any connection with the U.S. military", the Times reported. The Lincoln Group "helps translate and place the stories. The Lincoln Group's Iraqi staff, or its subcontractors, sometimes pose as freelance reporters or advertising executives when they deliver the stories to Baghdad media outlets."

The Times piece continued, "Military officials familiar with the effort in Iraq said much of it was being directed by the 'Information Operations Task Force' in Baghdad, part of the multinational corps headquarters commanded by Army Lt. Gen. John R. Vines. ... As part of a psychological operations campaign that has intensified over the last year, the task force also had purchased an Iraqi newspaper and taken control of a radio station, and was using them to channel pro-American messages to the Iraqi public. Neither is identified as a military mouthpiece".

Voice of America noted that while the official communications principles state information will be "timely and accurate", they "do not include any prohibition against paying to place stories in the media."

"Pentagon documents indicate the Lincoln Group ... received a $100 million contract to help produce favorable articles, translate the articles into Arabic, get them placed in Iraqi newspapers and not reveal the Pentagon's role", according to MSNBC's December 1, 2005, Hardball with Chris Matthews. Additionally, the Chicago Tribune reported that "Lincolns' PR workers in Iraq included three Republican operatives who helped run the Bush campaign in Illinois and had no apparent experience in Iraq."

In March 2006, The Independent published several examples of news stories produced by the Lincoln Group in late 2005. The Independent's Andrew Buncombe gives his opinion of how these stories distort the actual events of the Iraq war.

== Pentagon investigation ==
Regarding the news reports about the military planting news stories, United States Department of State spokesman Sean McCormack said in his November 30, 2005, daily press briefing that his "colleagues over at the Pentagon" were "looking in[to]" and were "probably in the best position to address those news reports." A reporter then commented: "Why would they have to look into the news reports if it's – if it's happening, wouldn't they know they did it."

On the November 30, 2005, Hardball, Senator John Warner (R-Virginia) told Chris Matthews "I saw that for the first time today. And as chairman of the U.S. Senate Committee on Armed Services, we'll look into that because I'm concerned that our credibility abroad is very important. And if we're manufacturing things or taking our wonderful troops and trying to translate their ideas into something that's more our idea, rather than the trooper's idea, then I think we should be looking at it."

In his December 1, 2005, press briefing, White House spokesman Scott McClellan said that "the Los Angeles Times was the first place" the White House had heard about "the military using this Lincoln Group to plant stories in Iraqi newspapers" and that "We have asked the Department of Defense for more information. General [Pete] Pace has asked people to look into the matter and get the facts, and so we want to see what those facts are."

On December 3, the U.S. military command in Baghdad acknowledged for the first time that it had paid Iraqi newspapers to carry positive news about U.S. efforts in Iraq, but officials characterized the payments as part of a legitimate campaign to counter insurgents' misinformation.
