= UVa Online Judge =

Online platform for competitive programming practice problems

UVa Online Judge is an online automated judge for programming problems hosted by University of Valladolid. Its problem archive has over 4300 problems and user registration is open to everyone. There are currently over 100000 registered users. A user may submit a solution in ANSI C (C89), C++ (C++98), Pascal, Java, C++11 or Python. Originally it began without the last three options, but the Java option was added in 2001, the C++11 option was added in 2014, then the Python option was added in 2016.

UVa OJ also hosts contests. In the contest environment the user has a limited time to solve a small set of problems

== History ==
The UVa OJ was created in 1995 by Miguel Ángel Revilla, a mathematician teaching algorithms at the University of Valladolid in Spain. Ciriaco García de Celis, an informatics student at the University of Valladolid, implemented the first version of the judge using Bash, and then developed and maintained it for more than eight years.

In April 1997, the judge became open to the public (not just students of the university). In November 1999 and 2000 UVa hosted the ACM-ICPC SWERC programming contest. In July 2000, UVa Online Judge started to host training contests. By September 2007, 5.9 million programs were submitted by more than 63000 users.

In September 2007 a new system, developed by Miguel Revilla Rodríguez, was launched at a new server at the Baylor University, the headquarters of the ACM-ICPC contest.

== See also ==
- Competitive programming
