= LeetCode =

Online platform for coding interview preparation

- Website type: Private
- Founded: 7 August 2015
- Headquarters: Palo Alto, California, {{{location_country}}}
- Owner: Leetcode LLC
- Founder: Winston Tang
- Key people: Hercy Chang (CEO)
- Industry: Software
- Employees: 264 (2025)
- Website: leetcode.com; leetcode.cn (in Chinese)

LeetCode is an online platform for software coding interview preparation. The site provides algorithmic problems intended for users to learn and practice programming. Since the company founding in 2015, the LeetCode platform has gained popularity among job seekers in the software industry and coding enthusiasts as a resource for technical interviews and coding competitions. As of 2025, the website has 26.3 million monthly visitors.

== History ==
LeetCode was founded in Silicon Valley in 2015 by Winston Tang. After moving to the US from Malaysia in 2005, Tang founded the company, citing his own experiences working at Amazon and Google as inspiration.

LeetCode expanded its operations to China in 2018, providing Chinese problems, solutions and forums on its Chinese website Likou (Chinese: 力扣; pinyin: Lìkòu). In 2021, LeetCode secured its first round of funding, receiving a $10 million investment from Lightspeed China Partners.

== Features ==
LeetCode offers both free and premium access options. While free users have access to a limited number of questions, premium users gain access to additional questions previously used in interviews at large tech companies. The performance of users' solutions is evaluated based on execution speed and memory usage, and is ranked against other submissions in the LeetCode database.

Additionally, LeetCode provides its users with mock interviews and online assessments. LeetCode hosts weekly and biweekly contests, each having 4 problems. After participating in a contest for the first time, one gets assigned a ranking, which can be found in their profile. LeetCode also provides its users with daily challenges, following UTC, with a lucky draw at the end of each month for those who stayed consistent for the month.

LeetCode supports a wide range of programming languages, including Java, Python, JavaScript, and C. Since September 2024, LeetCode China supports Huawei's Cangjie programming language for all problems.

The platform features forums where users can engage in discussions related to problems, the interview process, and share their interview experiences.

== Types of problems ==
Every question on LeetCode has a particular category or tag. Some of the most common tags include arrays, strings, two pointers, stacks, binary search, sliding windows, linked lists, trees, tries, backtracking, heaps, priority queues, graphs, breadth-first search, depth-first search, dynamic programming, greedy algorithms, bit manipulation, database problems, and math. As of January 2026, LeetCode offers 3816 questions across its three levels of difficulty; with 922 questions categorized as easy, 1922 as medium, and 902 as hard.

== See also ==
- Coding interview
- Competitive programming
- Advent of Code
- Codeforces
- HackerRank
