= Ringo (software) =

- Developer(s): Riva FZC
- Initial release: 2014
- Final release: 3.1.1.8 (Android) / July 12, 2019; 6 years ago
- Operating system: Android, iOS, Windows Phone 8.x and Windows Mobile 10
- Available in: English, Spanish, Portuguese, French, German, Italian
- Type: PSTN, International call
- Website: web.archive.org/web/*/http://www.ringo.co

Ringo was an international calling app for smartphones that utilized dedicated phone circuits for making calls. Ringo used local phone networks instead of the user's smart phone's Internet connection to connect calls. The caller, but not the called party, downloaded and used the app to make calls. Apps were available for Android, iOS, and Windows Phone. Ringo launched in 2014 and was available for use in many countries, though not all supported all three calling methods:- callout, callback and WiFi. Calls could be made to mobile and landline phones in any country. Ringo was discontinued on March 31, 2021.

== History ==
Ringo was developed by start-up Riva FZC, the parent holding company of Ringo.

== Features and functionality ==
Ringo allowed users to make calls to any number in any destination worldwide and did not use a web connection for its calls. Users could purchase top-up credits through the app for Android and Windows Phone and through the website for iOS to make calls. When a call was made using Ringo, it was connected to a local phone network and assigned a local number. The system then switched the call to connect through submarine cables. At the receiver's destination country the call was connected to a local network again. Although the call was assigned different local numbers every time it was made, the receiver saw the caller's contact details only.
