= Divyank Turakhia =

Computer-programmer, businessman, entrepreneur and investor

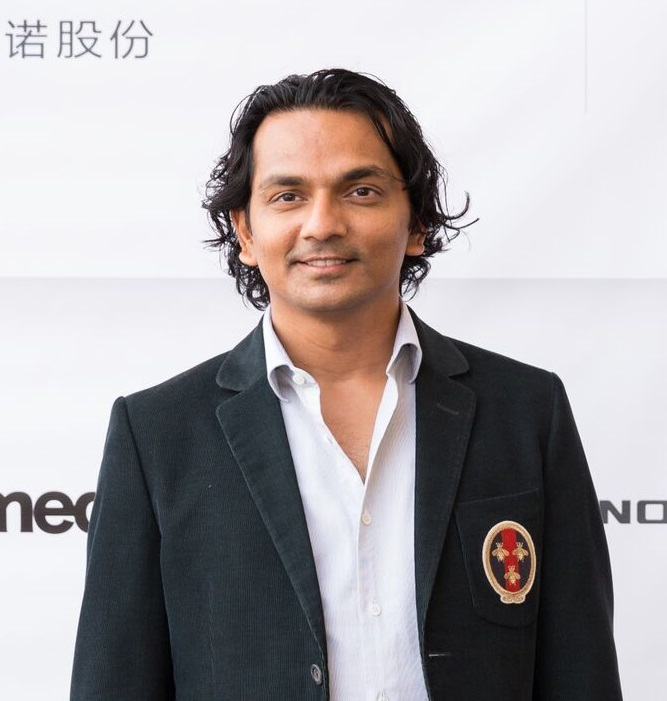
- Born: 29 January 1982 (age 44)
- Occupations: Founder of Ai.tech, Media.net
- Known for: Ai.tech, Media.net, Skenzo, Directi, Radix

Divyank Turakhia (born January 29, 1982) is an Indian-born computer-programmer, businessman, billionaire, serial entrepreneur, and investor. His net worth is estimated at $3.46 billion (as of Sept 2025). He founded Media.net, which he sold in 2016 to a Chinese consortium for $900 million, the third-largest ever ad-tech deal.

== Early life and education ==
Divyank Turakhia, was born on Jan 29, 1982 in India. He was interested in coding from a young age.

Divyank started coding at the age of eight. He received his early education from Arya Vidya Mandir in Bandra, Mumbai and later graduated from Narsee Monjee College of Commerce and Economics (University of Mumbai).

== Awards and recognition ==
- Top 100 Richest Indians 2025
- #2 in the IIFL Wealth and Hurun India 40 & Under Self-Made Rich List (2020)
- #9 in India's Richest Tech Billionaires by IIFL Hurun Rich List (2020)
- Youngest Indian Billionaire (2018, 2017, 2016)
- Youngest self-made Gulf billionaire (2017)
- #27 in the Global 40 under 40 Self-made Rich List (2017)
- 40 Most Influential Indians Under 40 by AsiaOne (2017)
- Ranked #95 on the Forbes list of India's 100 Richest People (2016)
- The ET Panache Trendsetter Award by The Economic Times (2016)
- Most Respected Indian Entrepreneur for 2016, Hurun Report
- "Winning Warrior" Bloomberg Television (2010)
- Enterprise Twenty20: 20 new business leaders in their 20s, Financial Express (2008)
- Asia's Best Entrepreneurs Under 25, BusinessWeek Magazine (2006)

== Personal life ==
Turakhia splits his time between homes in Dubai, Los Angeles, London, and San Francisco. Forbes called him a 'thrillionaire' because of his passion for aerobatic flying. He has one sibling, Bhavin Turakhia.
