= Contextual advertising =

Role of language in advertising

Contextual advertising (also called contextual targeting) is a form of targeted digital advertising. Contextual advertising is also called "In-Text" advertising or "In-Context" technology. In context targeting, advertisements are selected and placed by automated systems based on websites' linguistic content and the context of what a user is looking at.

As advertisers and marketers increasingly prioritize brand safety and suitability, contextual advertising has grown in prevalence. Contextual ads are commonly perceived as less irritating than traditional advertising, therefore influencing users more effectively. It reflects user interests, thus increasing the chance of receiving a response.

== How it works ==
A contextual advertising system scans the content of a website for specific keywords and phrases and then displays advertisements based on those keywords. For example, a user browsing a sports-related website sees advertisements for companies related to sports, such as sellers of sports memorabilia or tickets. Contextual advertising is also used by search engines to display advertisements on their search results pages based on the keywords in the user's query.

When a visitor does not click on an ad quickly enough (the minimum time a user must click on the ad), the ad automatically changes to the next relevant ad.

== Evolution of contextual advertising ==
=== Pre-GDPR ===
Launched in 2003, Google AdSense was the first major contextual advertising network. Changes to the leading advertiser Google Chrome browser are set to widen the market of contextual advertisers online. It works by providing webmasters with JavaScript code that, when inserted into webpages, displays relevant advertisements from the Google ad inventory. Relevance is calculated by a separate Googlebot that indexes the content of a webpage. Competitors use language-independent proximity pattern matching algorithms to increase matching accuracy.

Media.net was another major contextual ad network pioneer that competed with Google AdSense.

=== Privacy-first renaissance ===
Amid increasing data privacy regulations like GDPR, the potential loss of third-party cookies from Google, and Apple's App Tracking Transparency (ATT) rollout, the advertising industry needed better privacy-preserving targeting solutions. Contextual advertising has become increasingly widespread, especially with advances in machine learning that empower more sophisticated targeting in real time. A 2024 report from AdExchanger and Verve found that 60% of advertisers were already using contextual targeting, and that 70% of publishers and media companies were offering it to advertisers. The survey respondents indicated accelerating adoption of contextual: 93% of brands/agencies and 98% of publishers/media companies said they will have adopted contextual targeting by the end of 2025.
