= Russian AI Cup =

- Status: Active
- Frequency: Annually
- Country: Worldwide
- Years active: 2012-
- Inaugurated: 2012
- Previous event: 2019
- Next event: 2020
- Attendance: 8000 (2016)
- Budget: 5000$, smaller prizes for runners-up
- Patrons: Mail.Ru Group & My.Com
- Website: http://russianaicup.ru/?locale=en

Russian AI Cup is the annual championship on programming of an artificial intelligence organized by Mail.Ru Group and My.com.

The Russian AI Cup is carried out in the form of a game for descriptive reasons, clearness and simplicity. Briefly, participants create an algorithm that describes a game strategy. The resulting bot is fighting with other similar. The best of them wins the round. Thus, from a series of rounds the tournament which will take place in several stages will be organized.

On the one side, the main mechanics of a game is quite simple that it allows to write really minimum working strategy in a couple of hours. On another side — in game turned out a lot of nuances. To think over to sharpen strategy, rising up standings, it is possible indefinitely. In 2016 the contest is focused on the MOBA game CodeWizards.

== 2015 contest "CodeRacing" ==
In the 2015 contest, contestants must make an artificial intelligence to control a car on the squared-tile tracks. The rules are similar to the Rock n' Roll Racing game.

== 2016 contest "CodeWizards" ==
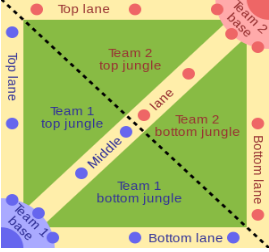

In the 2016 contest, contestants must make an artificial intelligence (strategy) to control a wizard in a special game world. The contest rules are based on a popular computer game genre MOBA. In each game, players will confront 5 strategies of other players. At the same time, they will have 4 allies. Each five strategies make a faction: Academy or Renegades. The main goal of the faction is to destroy an opposing faction's base. The main personal goal of each wizard is to gain maximal possible number of points. The winner of the game, as well as other places, is determined by the gained score. A player is given points when his wizard deals damage, destroys or is just hanging nearby during death of opposite faction's unit, as well as for some other actions. Each player of a faction is given a significant number of points in case of reaching the main faction goal.

The championship runs from 26 November until 18 December. Winning participants will receive prizes. There is the "Sandbox", which is working between rounds. In the "Sandbox" participants can improve their strategies.
