= Competitive programming =

Mind sport

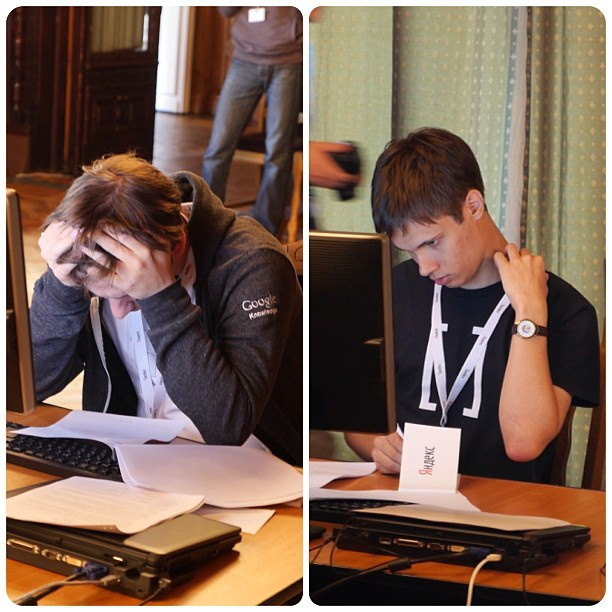
Petr Mitrichev (left) and Gennady Korotkevich (right), two prominent competitive programmers during the 2013 Yandex algorithm cup

Competitive programming, or sport programming, is a mind sport involving participants trying to program according to given specifications. The contests are usually held over the Internet or a local network. Competitive programming is recognized and supported by several multinational software and Internet companies, such as Google and Meta.

A programming competition generally involves the host presenting a set of logical or mathematical problems, also known as puzzles or challenges, to the contestants (who can vary in number from tens or even hundreds to several thousand). Contestants are required to write computer programs capable of solving these problems. Judging is mostly based on the number of problems solved and the time spent writing successful solutions, but may also consider other factors such as output quality, execution time. memory usage, and program size.

== History ==
One of the oldest contests known is the International Collegiate Programming Contest (ICPC) which originated in the 1970s and has grown to include 88 countries in its 2011 edition.

From 1990 to 1994, Owen Astrachan, Vivek Khera and David Kotz ran one of the first distributed, internet-based programming contests inspired by the ICPC.

Interest in competitive programming has grown extensively since 2000 to tens of thousands of participants (see Notable competitions), and is strongly connected to the growth of the Internet, which facilitates holding international contests online, eliminating geographical problems.

== Overview ==
The aim of competitive programming is to write computer programs which are able to solve given problems. A vast majority of problems appearing in programming contests are mathematical or logical in nature. Typical such tasks belong to one of the following categories: combinatorics, number theory, graph theory, algorithmic game theory, computational geometry, string analysis, discrete mathematics and data structures. Problems related to constraint programming and artificial intelligence are also popular in certain competitions.

Irrespective of the problem category, the process of solving a problem can be divided into two broad steps: constructing an efficient algorithm, and implementing the algorithm in a suitable programming language (the set of programming languages allowed varies from contest to contest). These are the two most commonly tested skills in programming competitions.

In most contests, the judging is done automatically by host machines, commonly known as judges. Every solution submitted by a contestant is run on the judge against a set of (usually secret) test cases. Normally, contest problems have an all-or-none marking system, meaning that a solution is "Accepted" only if it produces satisfactory results on all test cases run by the judge, and is rejected otherwise. However, some contest problems may allow for partial scoring, depending on the number of test cases passed, the quality of the results, or some other specified criteria. Some other contests only require that the contestant submit the output corresponding to given input data, in which case the judge only has to analyze the submitted output data.

Online judges are online environments in which testing takes place. Online judges have rank lists showing users with the biggest number of accepted solutions and/or shortest execution time for a particular problem.

== Notable competitions ==
=== Algorithm competitions ===
Name of the competition	Organizers	Audience	Description	Number of participants
Google Code Jam (GCJ)	Google	open	Annual competition organized and sponsored by Google from 2003 until its cancellation in 2023.	32,702 (2022)
International Collegiate Programming Contest (ICPC)	ICPC Foundation	university students	Team competition for university students, the contest consists of many regional rounds that conclude in a world final organized yearly. Teams consist of three students from the same university and they are allowed to use only one computer.	50,000+ (2022)
International Olympiad in Informatics (IOI)	IOI	Pre-University Students	International competition for secondary school students. Organized yearly since 1989. Each country can send at most 4 participants to compete.	375 from 92 countries (2026)
Meta Hacker Cup (formerly Facebook Hacker Cup)	Meta Platforms	open	Annual competition held since 2011. Organized and sponsored by Meta (formerly Facebook).	27,604 (2022)
Topcoder Open (TCO)	Topcoder	open	Annual algorithm competition held from 2001 until its cancellation in 2023	

In most of the above competitions, competitions are usually organized in several rounds. They usually start with online rounds, which conclude in the onsite final round. The top performers at IOI and ICPC receive gold, silver and bronze medals. In the other contests, cash prizes are awarded to the top finishers. The competitions also attract the interest of recruiters from multiple software and Internet companies, which often reach out to competitors with potential job offers.

=== Artificial intelligence and machine learning ===
- List may be incomplete

Name	Main Organizers	Description	Status
Kaggle	Google	Data science, machine learning and mathematical optimization competition platform and online community.	Active
AI Challenge	University of Waterloo	International artificial intelligence programming contest that ran from 2009 to 2011.	Inactive
Halite AI Programming Competition	Two Sigma, Cornell Tech	Computer programming contest where participants build bots in desired programming language to compete on a two-dimensional battlefield.	Unknown
Russian AI Cup	Mail.Ru Group, My.com	Annual artificial intelligence programming contest.	Unknown

=== Contests focusing on open-source technologies ===
- List may be incomplete

Contest Name	Main Sponsor	Description	Running Since	Usual Time	Next Application Cycle	Status
Multi-Agent Programming Contest	Clausthal University of Technology in conjunction with agent-oriented workshops	Annual international programming competition to stimulate research in the area of multi-agent system development and programming.	2005	Sept	Sept 2011	Active
Google Summer of Code	Google Inc.	An annual program in which Google awards stipends to hundreds of students who successfully complete a requested free software/open-source coding project during the summer.	2005	Mar-Aug	Mar 23- Apr 3	Active
Google Highly Open Participation Contest	Google Inc.	A contest run by Google in 2007–8 aimed at high school students. The contest is designed to encourage high school students to participate in open-source projects.	2007	Nov-Feb	Unknown	Unknown

== Online platforms ==
The programming community around the world has created and maintained several internet-resources dedicated to competitive programming. They offer standalone contests with or without minor prizes. Users will typically be assigned a rating based on their performance on said contests. The archives of past problems are popular resources for training in competitive programming. There are several organizations that host programming competitions on a regular basis. These include:

Name	Description
Advent of Code	An annual programming competition taking place during Advent, with a new pair of puzzles released each day, up to and including Christmas Day. The second problem of each day is locked until the completion of the first part, and usually follows on from it logically. There are both global and private leaderboards for each year, where rankings are based on who solves the problem first.
CodeChef	Maintained by Unacademy, it hosts a 3-day-long contest and a couple of short contests every month (one IOI styled called Lunchtime and another ICPC styled called Cook-Off), and provides a contest hosting platform to educational institutions for free. The top two winners of the long contest win cash prizes while the top 10 global get a t-shirt.
Codeforces	Russian platform, maintained by ITMO University, which provides frequent 2–3 hour contests (available in English and Russian). Users can also participate on contests published by other users on the "gym" section, submit additional test cases to "hack" submissions from other competitors during contests, write blogs to share techniques with one another and see the source code for the solutions from other users. Contestants that achieve a high enough rating may be granted additional features like being able to add tags to problems and propose problem sets to official contests.
CodinGame	Puzzles (increasing difficulty), code golf. Hosts regular online competitions (coding games and programming challenges).
Codewars	A community-driven platform with in Online integrated development environment where users solve kata—small coding challenges—in a wide variety of languages. Users earn ranks and honor as they complete challenges and create new ones. Emphasizes learning through practice and peer review, with solutions and discussions available after each challenge is completed.
HackerEarth	Bangalore, India based company providing an online contest like environment aiming at providing recruitment assessment solutions.
HackerRank	HackerRank offers programming problems in different domains of Computer Science. It also hosts annual Codesprints which help connect the coders and Silicon Valley startups.
LeetCode	LeetCode has over 2,300 questions covering many different programming concepts and offers weekly and bi-weekly contests. The programming tasks are offered in English and Chinese.
Project Euler	Large collection of computational math problems (i.e. not directly related to programming but often requiring programming skills for solving). Different from other online judges, source code is not necessary to submit solutions. Instead, each problem just requires a numerical answer (which is normally too large to guess or calculate by hand), allowing users to use any methods they see fit for solving the problems, including whether or not to choose a programming language.
SPOJ	Polish online judge system which provides a lot of problems for training, and provides a platform for other organizers to host their programming contests.
Topcoder	US resource and company, which organizes contests and also provides industrial problems as a kind of free-lance job; it offers dozens of short contests and several long ("marathons") every year. Specific feature - participants have a chance to check the correctness of other contestants' solutions after the coding phase and before final automatic testing (so-called "challenge phase").
UVa Online Judge	Contains over 4,500 problems for practising. Hosts regular online competitions. Opened in 1995, it is one of the oldest such websites.

== Benefits and criticism ==
Participation in programming contests may increase student enthusiasm for computer science studies. The skills acquired in ICPC-like programming contests also improve career prospects, as they help to pass the "technical interviews", which often require candidates to solve complex programming and algorithmic problems on the spot.

There has also been criticism of competitive programming, particularly from professional software developers. One critical point is that many fast-paced programming contests teach competitors bad programming habits and code style (like unnecessary use of macros, lack of OOP abstraction and comments, use of short variable names, etc.). Also, by offering only small algorithmic puzzles with relatively short solutions, programming contests like ICPC and IOI do not necessarily teach good software engineering skills and practices, as real software projects typically have many thousands of lines of code and are developed by large teams over long periods of time. Peter Norvig stated that based on the available data, being a winner of programming contests correlated negatively with a programmer's performance at their job at Google (even though contest winners had higher chances of getting hired). Norvig later stated that this correlation was observed on a small data set, but that it could not be confirmed after examining a larger data set.

Another sentiment is that rather than spending time on excessive competing by solving problems with known solutions, high-profile programmers should instead invest their time in solving real-world problems.

== Literature ==
- Halim, S., Halim, F. (2013). Competitive Programming 3: The New Lower Bound of Programming Contests. Lulu.
- Laaksonen, A. (2017). Guide to Competitive Programming (Undergraduate Topics in Computer Science). Cham: Springer International Publishing.
- Xu, X. (2020) The development, prosperity and decline of Olympic in Informatics. Published online.
- Kostka, B. (2021). Sports programming in practice. University of Wrocław.

== See also ==
- AlphaCode — Google Deepmind project for AI-assisted software development
- Algorithmic Puzzles
- Category:Computer science competitions
- Code golf
- Game jam
- Hackathon
- Datathon
