= Flock (messaging service) =

Proprietary messaging and collaboration tool

- Original author: Bhavin Turakhia
- Developer: Flock FZ-LLC
- Release: 2014
- Operating system: iOS; Android; Chrome macOS; Windows
- Type: Collaborative software, Instant messaging, Online chat
- Website: flock.com

Flock is a proprietary messaging and collaboration tool, founded by tech entrepreneur Bhavin Turakhia in 2014. The app is available on Windows, MacOS, Android, iOS and Web.

Flock allows users to configure external apps and integrations from the Flock App Store, and receive notifications and updates directly in Flock.

Flock functions on a freemium pricing model. The application was launched in 2014.

== Features ==
The primary features of Flock are direct & channel messaging, video conferencing, screen & file sharing, and unlimited chat history.

=== Teams ===
Flock users can create multiple teams for the entire company, a department or for selective members of the organisation. To join a team and communicate, users can send invites to others or share the Team URL.

=== Channels ===
Flock users can create public channels and private channels. Public channels are open for everyone to discover and join, and do not require an invitation from the team admin. These channels are meant for sharing knowledge, interests and experiences. Private channels are meant for more focused discussions, and can be joined by invite only.

== Native apps ==
Flock comes pre-installed with business apps such as:

- Poll app
- Shared To-dos
- Mailcast
- Code snippet sharing
- Reminders
- Note sharing
- My Favourites

== API ==
Flock provides its platform, FlockOS, for developers to build apps, bots and custom integrations on top of Flock. Flock conducts regular hackathons to help young developers build innovative apps by using FlockOS's capabilities.

== App Store ==
Flock lets users integrate external apps and services from the Flock App Store. Some common apps include Google Drive, Google Analytics, Trello, GitHub, Twitter and Mailchimp. Developers can also publish apps built on FlockOS to the Flock App Store.

== Awards ==
- Best Business Communication App of the Year by Global Mobile App Summit & Awards, July 2016
- Best Mobile Enterprise Product/Service Award by India Digital Awards 2017, February 2017
