= Photoacoustics =

Photoacoustics could refer to:

- Photoacoustic spectroscopy
- Multispectral optoacoustic tomography
- Photoacoustic imaging
