= Kino FM =

Kino FM (98 FM — 98 hits) (Russian: Кино́ FM (98 FM — 98 хито́в); [kʲɪˈno ɛf ɛm]) was a Moscow music radio station broadcasting all day in FM at a frequency of 98.0 MHz. Kino FM - owned and operated by United Media (now Rumedia) of Vladimir Lisin - started broadcasting in 2007 as a thematic radio station dedicated to the film industry. In the beginning they used to transmit programmes with films information, programmes about cinema stars, film history and everything related to the world of cinema. The broadcast songs were about Russian and foreign films. On the night of 26–27 October 2008, the radio format changed, specially about music; then radio broadcasts were based on recent music of Russian and foreign artists or bands. Kino FM's last jingle was "98 FM - 98 Hits" but the official name of the station was the same as it was in the beginning - "Кино́ ФМ Москва́" (literally - "Cinema FM" of Moscow), which sounds in the late night jingle, in the beginning of the new day hours.

On 22 December the radio had its last transmission, changing at midnight on 23 December to broadcast as a new radio station, Radio Shokolad [ˈradiʲo ˌʂɐkəˈlat].

== Programmes ==
Besides music, there were thematic programmes with production of their own, at the 20th minute of each hour of broadcasting:

- «Исто́рии любви́» (Love Story)
- «Геогра́фия кино́» (Cinema's Geography)
- «Исто́рия кино́» (History of Cinema)
- «Путеше́ствия» (Travel)
- «Тест-драйв» ("Test-drive")
- «Рестора́нные но́вости». (Restaurant News)

=== Other minor programmes ===
At the 10th minute there was a small production, called "Автор жжёт" ([ˈavtər ˌʒʒʲot], literally - Author burn), where a professional actor read the lyrics of a random Russian music song which was no longer broadcast.
