= HackerRank =

Competitive programming company

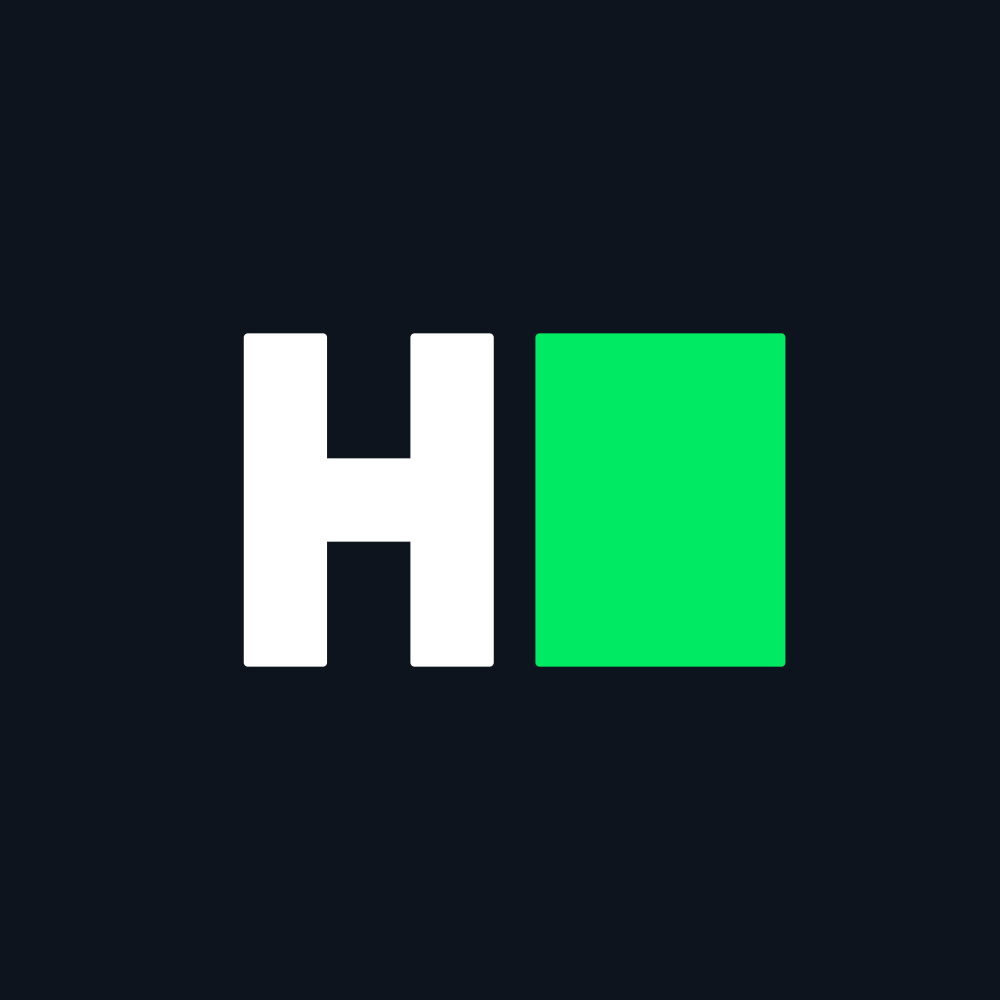
- Formerly: Interview Street, Inc.
- Founded: 1 July 2012
- Founders: Vivek Ravisankar; Harishankaran Karunanidhi
- Headquarters: Mountain View, CA, United States
- Website: www.hackerrank.com

HackerRank is a technology company that offers competitive programming services where computer programmers compete by writing programs according to provided specifications. HackerRank's programming challenges can be solved in multiple programming languages, and these challenges are sorted into different computer science fields.

Programmers are automatically scored and ranked globally based on their performance in these challenges. In addition to individual coding challenges, HackerRank also hosts contests where users compete on the same programming challenges during a set period of time and are then ranked at the conclusion of the event. These challenges are a form of gamification. The consumer side of their website is free for coders to use.

== History ==
HackerRank was founded as InterviewStreet Inc. by two NIT Trichy alumni, Vivek Ravisankar and Hari Karunanidhi. HackerRank is a Y Combinator-backed company, and was the first Indian company accepted into Y Combinator. They also participated in TechCrunch Disrupt in 2012.

In July 2015, HackerRank received $7.5 million funding from Japanese firm Recruit Holdings’ HR technology fund. On February 13, 2018 HackerRank announced it had raised $30 million in Series C funding, led by JMI Equity.

In December 2019, HackerRank acquired Mimir, a cloud-based service that provides tools for teaching computer science courses. Mimir is used by Google and some universities including Michigan State, UCLA, Oregon State and Purdue. Mimir is HackerRank’s first acquisition.

== HackerRank for Work ==
Their enterprise-side product, HackerRank for Work, is a subscription service that aims to help companies source, screen (CodePair), and hire engineers and other technical employees. The product is intended to allow technical recruiters to use programming challenges to test candidates on their specific programming skills and better understand their qualification for a certain role. Candidate's challenges, once submitted, are auto-scored and the results are then provided to the technical recruiter for review. In addition to screening, HackerRank also hosts programming hackathons, referred to as CodeSprints, as a way for companies to source technical candidates.

== See also ==
- Hackathon
- Codeforces
- LeetCode
