= CCC =

CCC may refer to:

== Arts and entertainment ==
- The Ambassadors of Death, a 1970 Doctor Who serial with production code CCC
- CCC Film, a film production company in Germany
- Canadian Chamber Choir, a musical ensemble
- Color Climax Corporation, a Danish pornography producer
- Comics Campaign Council, a British pressure group against horror comics

== Companies ==
- Canadian Commercial Corporation, supporting exporters
- Canterbury of New Zealand, a sports apparel company
- CCC Film, a film production company in Germany
- Color Climax Corporation, a Danish pornography company
- Commodity Credit Corporation, US corporation supporting farmers
- Consolidated Contractors Company, Middle East
- Cooper Cameron Corporation, later Cameron International
- Copyright Clearance Center, a U.S. company
- Crane Carrier Company, a U.S. truck manufacturer
- Cwmni Cyfyngedig Cyhoeddus, a Welsh form of public limited company

== Facilities and infrastructure ==
- Colorado Convention Center, US
- Corsham Computer Centre, operated by the UK Royal Navy
- Crescent City Connection, twin cantilever bridges
- Cultural and Conference Center of Heraklion, a performing arts centre in Greece
- Jardines del Rey Airport, Cuba, by IATA code

== Organizations ==
=== Christian organizations ===
- Calvinist Cadet Corps, a mentoring organization
- Campus Crusade for Christ, later Cru (Christian organization), interdenominational
- Catechism of the Catholic Church
- Celestial Church of Christ, an African Church
- China Christian Council, Protestant organization
- Christian Cultural Center, non-denominational, New York City, US
- Clearwater Christian College, Florida, US
- Colorado Community Church, interdenominational, US
- Community Christian College, Redlands, California, US

=== Civil authorities ===
- Cambridgeshire County Council, England
- Chittagong City Corporation, Bangladesh
- Christchurch City Council, local government authority for Christchurch in New Zealand

=== Other government and quasi-government agencies ===
- California Coastal Commission
- California Correctional Center, a US state prison
- Corruption and Crime Commission of Western Australia
- Crime and Corruption Commission, Queensland, Australia

=== Conservation ===
- California Conservation Corps
- Cetacean Conservation Center, Chile
- Civilian Conservation Corps, US work program 1933–1942
- Climate Change Committee, UK

=== Politics and advocacy ===
- Center for Community Change, US
- Citizens Coalition For Change, a Zimbabwean political party
- Citizens' Committee for Children
- Climate Change Coalition, Australian political party
- Command for Hunting Communists, 1960s Brazilian paramilitary terrorist group
- Comics Campaign Council, a British pressure group against horror comics
- Communist Combatant Cells, a 1980s Belgian terrorist organization
- Communist Committee of Cabinda, a separatist group in the Cabinda exclave of Angola
- Council of Conservative Citizens, a US white separatist organization
- Customs Cooperation Council, an intergovernmental organization
- National Coloured Congress, previously the Cape Coloured Congress (CCC)

=== Other organizations ===
- Canadian Chamber Choir, a musical ensemble
- Le Club des Chefs des Chefs, an organisation of kitchen chefs of world leaders
- Chaos Computer Club, a hacker organisation
- Citizen Cyberscience Centre, based in Switzerland
- Co-operative Correspondence Club

== People ==
- Carly Colón or Carlito Caribbean Cool (born 1979), Puerto Rican wrestler
- William Ralston Balch (1852 – 1923), American journalist who wrote by the pseudonym C. C. C.

== Schools ==
=== United States ===
- California Community Colleges System
- Camden County College, New Jersey
- Cayuga Community College, New York
- City Colleges of Chicago
- Clackamas Community College, Oregon City, Oregon
- Clatsop Community College, Clatsop County, Oregon
- Clearwater Central Catholic High School, Florida
- Clearwater Christian College, Florida
- Clinton Community College (Iowa), Clinton, Iowa
- Clovis Community College (California), Clovis, California
- Clovis Community College (New Mexico), Clovis, New Mexico
- Club Coordination Council, University of Notre Dame, Indiana student union
- Coahoma Community College, Mississippi
- Coconino County Community College, Flagstaff, Arizona
- Columbia College Chicago, Chicago, Illinois
- Community Christian College, Redlands, California
- Cuyahoga Community College, Ohio

=== Elsewhere ===
- Castleknock Community College, Carpenterstown, Dublin, Ireland
- Cebu Central Colleges, later University of Cebu, Philippines
- Centro de Capacitación Cinematográfica, film school in Mexico City
- City College of Calamba, Philippines
- Cooloola Christian College, Gympie, Queensland, Australia
- Corpus Christi College (disambiguation), several colleges
- Cumilla Cadet College, Cumilla, Bangladesh

== Science, technology, and mathematics ==
=== Biology and medicine ===
- Continuous curvilinear capsulorhexis, a type of cataract surgery
- Clinical Care Classification System, US standardized nursing terminology
- cccDNA (covalently closed circular DNA), a special form of DNA
- CCC, a codon for the amino acid proline

=== Computing ===
- Canadian Computing Competition
- Chaos Computer Club, hacker organisation
- Citizen Cyberscience Centre, based in Switzerland
- Computational Complexity Conference, academic conference
- Corsham Computer Centre, operated by the UK Royal Navy
- Color Cell Compression, an algorithm

=== Mathematics ===
- Cartesian closed category, a concept in category theory
- CCC, Roman numeral for 300
- Countable chain condition, in order theory
- CCC_{n}, cube-connected cycles of order n in graph theory

=== Other uses in science and technology ===
- Comb ceramic culture
- Conformal cyclic cosmology, a cosmological model
- Countercurrent chromatography, a chromatographic technique
- Cryogenic current comparator, a precision ammeter

== Sport ==
=== Competitions ===
- California Coast Classic Bike Tour, a U.S. race
- Cascade Cycling Classic, a former U.S. race
- CONCACAF Champions Cup, a continental international football tournament
- Courmayeur–Champex–Chamonix, a running race along the Ultra-Trail du Mont-Blanc

=== Conferences and governing bodies ===
- Cascade Collegiate Conference, an athletic conference in the Northwestern US
- Central Connecticut Conference, a U.S. athletic conference
- Commonwealth Coast Conference, former name of the US college athletic conference now known as the Conference of New England
- Cross Country Canada, a skiing governing body
- Northern California Junior College Conference, originally called the California Coast Conference

=== Clubs and teams ===
- CCC Pro Team, a former Polish cycling team
- Colombo Cricket Club, Sri Lanka
- Compton Cricket Club, a California exhibition cricket club
- County cricket club, a type of cricket club in England and Wales

== Other uses ==
- Canadian Computing Competition
- The Capacity to Combat Corruption (CCC) Index, a report by Americas Quarterly magazine
- Cash Conversion Cycle, in management accounting
- China Compulsory Certificate, a safety mark
- Cox's Criminal Cases, law reports

== See also ==
- Triple C's, popular nickname for the rap group Carol City Cartel
- CC (disambiguation)
- C3 (disambiguation)
- CCCC (disambiguation)
- 300 (disambiguation)
- Fate/Extra CCC
