= List of schools in Cagayan de Oro =

This is a list of educational institutions in Cagayan de Oro, Philippines.

== Elementary and Grade School ==
This is a list of Public and Private Elementary and Grade Schools in Cagayan de Oro.

=== Public Elementary Schools ===
The Department of Education - Division of Cagayan de Oro has 9 districts.

Central District

- City Central School
  Yacapin-Velez Sts., Cagayan de Oro
- Corrales Elementary School
  Corrales Ave., Cagayan de Oro

East District II

- Cugman Elementary School
  National Highway, Cugman, Cagayan de Oro
- East City Central School
  National Highway, Lapasan, Cagayan de Oro
- F.S. Catanico Elementary School
  F.S. Catanico, Cagayan de Oro
- Gusa Elementary School
  Gusa, Cagayan de Oro
- Kamakawan Elementary School
  Agusan, Cagayan de Oro
- Malasag Elementary School
  Malasag, Gusa, Cagayan de Oro

East District I

- Balubal Elementary School
  Balubal, Cagayan de Oro
- Bugo Central School
  Bugo, Cagayan de Oro
- Linangohan Elementary School
  Tablon, Cagayan de Oro
- Palalan Elementary School
  Tablon, Cagayan de Oro
- Puerto Elementary School
  National Highway, Puerto, Cagayan de Oro
- Suntingon Elementary School
  Suntingon, Bugo, Cagayan de Oro
- Tablon Elementary School
  National Highway, Tablon, Cagayan de Oro City

North District I

- Macabalan Elementary School
  Macabalan, Cagayan de Oro
- North City Central School
  Puntod, Cagayan de Oro
- Consolacion Elementary School
  Consolacion, Cagayan de Oro

North District II

- Bayabas Elementary School
  Bayabas, Cagayan de Oro
- Bonbon Elementary School
  Bonbon, Cagayan de Oro
- Bongbongon Elementary School
  NHA, Kauswagan, Cagayan de Oro
- Kauswagan Central School
  Kauswagan, Cagayan de Oro

South District

- Camaman-an Elementary School
  Camaman-an, Cagayan de Oro
- Indahag Elementary School
  Indahag, Cagayan de Oro
- Macasandig Elementary School
  Macasandig, Cagayan de Oro
- South City Central School
  Nazareth, Cagayan de Oro
- Taguanao Elementary School
  Taguanao, Indahag, Cagayan de Oro

Southwest District

- Bayanga Elementary School
  Bayanga, Cagayan de Oro
- Besigan Elementary School
  Besigan, Cagayan de Oro
- Dansolihon Elementary School
  Dansolihon, Cagayan de Oro
- Kiam-is Elementary School
  Kiam-is, Lumbia, Cagayan de Oro
- Lumbia Elementary School
  Lumbia, Cagayan de Oro
- Magayad Elementary School
  Tignapoloan, Cagayan de Oro
- Mambuaya Elementary School
  Mambuaya, Cagayan de Oro
- Pagalungan Elementary School
  Pagalungan, Cagayan de Oro
- Pigsag-an Elementary School
  Pigsag-an, Cagayan de Oro
- Taglimao Elementary School
  Taglimao, Cagayan de Oro
- Tagpangi Elementary School
  Tagpangi, Cagayan de Oro
- Tignapoloan Elementary School
  Tignapoloan, Cagayan de Oro
- Tuburan Elementary School
  Tuburan, Cagayan de Oro
- Tumpagon Elementary School
  Tumpagon, Cagayan de Oro

West District I

- Balulang Elementary School
  Balulang, Cagayan de Oro
- Fr. William F. Masterson, S.J. Elementary School
  Upper Balulang, Cagayan de Oro
- Macanhan Elementary School
  Macanhan, Carmen, Cagayan de Oro
- Sacred Heart Village Elementary School
  Carmen, Cagayan de Oro
- PIKIFI - Sacred Heart Village Elementary School - Annex
  Canitoan, Cagayan de Oro
- Upper Carmen Elementary School
  Upper Carmen, Cagayan de Oro
- West City Central School
  Ilaya, Carmen, Cagayan de Oro
- Baikingon Elementary School
  Baikingon, Cagayan de Oro
- Bulua Central School
  Macapagal Drive, Bulua, Cagayan de Oro
- Calaanan Elementary School
  Calaanan, Cagayan de Oro
- Camp Evangelista Elementary School
  Camp Evangelista, Patag, Cagayan de Oro
- Canitoan Elementary School
  Canitoan, Cagayan de Oro
- Iponan Elementary School
  Iponan, Cagayan de Oro
- Pagatpat Elementary School
  Pagatpat, Cagayan de Oro
- San Simon Elementary School
  San Simon, Cagayan de Oro

=== Private Elementary Schools ===
This following is the list of Private Elementary Schools in Cagayan de Oro.

- Abbas Orchard Montessori School
  Alwana Business Park, Cugman, Cagayan de Oro
- Angelicum Learning Center
  Carmen, Cagayan de Oro
- Assumption Montessori School
  Nazareth, Cagayan de Oro
- Assumption Montessori School
  Balulang, Cagayan de Oro
- Blessed Child Academy
  Carmen, Cagayan de Oro
- Blessed Mother College
  Iponan, Cagayan de Oro
- Bugo Christian School
  Bugo, Cagayan de Oro
- Cagayan de Oro Christian School
  C.M. Recto Avenue, Cagayan de Oro
- Cagayan de Oro College
  Carmen, Cagayan de Oro
- Capitol University Basic Education Department
  Gusa, Cagayan de Oro
- Children's Progressive School
  Ilaya, Carmen, Cagayan de Oro
- Corpus Christi School
  Macasandig, Cagayan de Oro
  Pueblo de Oro, Cagayan de Oro
- Cagayan de Oro Adventist Elementary School
  Puntod, Cagayan de Oro
- Diamond Evangelical School
  Camp Evangelista, Patag, Cagayan de Oro
- Divine Mercy School
  Villa Vicente, Cagayan de Oro
- First Baptist Academy
  Carmen, Cagayan de Oro
- Golden Boulevard Seventh-day Adventist Elementary School
  Upper Carmen, Cagayan de Oro
- Grent Learning Center
  Bulua, Cagayan de Oro
- Holy Trinity Learning Center
  Nazareth, Cagayan de Oro
- Immanuel Mission International School
  Dagong Carmen, Cagayan de Oro
- International School
  Kauswagan, Cagayan de Oro
- Kong Hua School
  Kauswagan, Cagayan de Oro
- Liceo de Cagayan University
  Carmen, Cagayan de Oro
- Lourdes College Grade School
  Macasandig, Cagayan de Oro
- Mary-Infant Jesus School
  Bulao, Iponan, Cagayan de Oro
- Marymount Academy
  Balongis, Balulang, Cagayan de Oro
- Merry Child School
  Zone 7, Bulua, Cagayan de Oro
- Mindanao Christ's Gospel Academy, Inc., Bulua Cagayan de Oro
- Montessori De Oro
  Tiano-Echem Sts., Cagayan de Oro
- Nanuri International School
  Taguanao, Indahag, Cagayan de Oro
- Oro Christian Grace School
  Macasandig, Cagayan de Oro
- Oro Institute of Technology
  Lapasan, Cagayan de Oro
- Philippine Southfield School
  Bugo, Cagayan de Oro
- Philadelphian Christian Academy
  Lumbia, Cagayan de Oro
- Pilgrim Christian College
  Capistrano St., Cagayan de Oro
- Rosevale School
  Masterson Ave., Cagayan de Oro
- Sacred Heart Academy
  Bugo, Cagayan de Oro
- Sacred Heart of Jesus Montessori School
  C.M. Recto Avenue, Cagayan de Oro
  Gusa, Cagayan de Oro
- Shekinah Glory Christian Academy
  Corrales-J.R. Borja Sts., Cagayan de Oro
- Southern Philippines College
  Julio Pacana St., Cagayan de Oro
- St. Francis Learning Center
  Gusa, Cagayan de Oro
- St. Joseph School
  Bugo, Cagayan de Oro
- St. Mary's Academy of Carmen
  Carmen, Cagayan de Oro
- St. Mary's School
  Mandumol, Macasandig, Cagayan de Oro
- Sta. Cecilia Learning Center
  Kauswagan, Cagayan de Oro
- Vita Basic Education School
  Bulua, Cagayan de Oro
- Xaris Theos Christian School
  Tipolohon, Cagayan de Oro
- Xavier University Grade School
  Pueblo de Oro, Cagayan de Oro
  Macasandig, Cagayan de Oro

== High school ==
This is a list of Public and Private High Schools in Cagayan de Oro.

=== Public High Schools ===
The following is a list of Public High Schools in Cagayan de Oro.

- Agusan National High School
  Agusan, Cagayan de Oro
- Angeles Sisters National High School
  Consolacion, Cagayan de Oro
- Balulang National High School
  Balulang, Cagayan de Oro
- Balubal National High School
  Balubal, Cagayan de Oro
- Bayabas National High School
  Bayabas, Cagayan de Oro
- Bayanga National High School
  Bayanga, Cagayan de Oro
- Besigan National High School
  Besigan, Cagayan de Oro
- Bonbon National High School
  Bonbon, Cagayan de Oro
- Bugo National High School
  Bugo, Cagayan de Oro
- Bulua National High School
  Bulua, Cagayan de Oro
- Cagayan de Oro National High School
  Nazareth, Cagayan de Oro
- Camaman-an National High School
  Camaman-an, Cagayan de Oro
- Canitoan National High School
  Canitoan, Cagayan de Oro
- Carmen National High School
  Macanhan, Carmen, Cagayan de Oro
- Consolacion National High School
  Consolacion, Cagayan de Oro
- Cugman National High School
  Cugman, Cagayan de Oro
- Dansolihon National High School
  Dansolihon, Cagayan de Oro
- East Gusa National High School
  Hillside Gusa, Cagayan de Oro
- F.S. Catanico National High School
  F.S. Catanico, Cagayan de Oro
- Indahag National High School
  Indahag, Cagayan de Oro
- Kauswagan National High School
  Kauswagan, Cagayan de Oro
- Lapasan National High School
  Lapasan, Cagayan de Oro
- Lumbia National High School
  Lumbia, Cagayan de Oro
- Macabalan National High School
  Macabalan, Cagayan de Oro
- Macasandig National High School
  Macasandig, Cagayan de Oro
- Mambuaya National High School
  Mambuaya, Cagayan de Oro
- Misamis Oriental General Comprehensive High School
  Velez St., Cagayan de Oro
- Patag National High School (BULUA NHS ANNEX)
  Patag, Cagayan de Oro
- Pagatpat National High School
  Pagatpat, Cagayan de Oro
- Pedro "Oloy" N. Roa Sr. High School
  Calaanan, Cagayan de Oro
- Pigsag-an National High School
  Pigsag-an, Cagayan de Oro
- Puerto National High School
  Puerto, Cagayan de Oro
- Puntod National High School
  Puntod, Cagayan de Oro
- San Simon National High School
  San Simon, Cagayan de Oro
- Tablon National High School
  Tablon, Cagayan de Oro
- Taglimao National High School
  Taglimao, Cagayan de Oro
- Tignapoloan National High School
  Tignapoloan, Cagayan de Oro
- Tuburan National High School
  Tuburan, Cagayan de Oro
- Tumpagon National High School
  Tumpagon, Cagayan de Oro

== Supreme student government history ==
The Student Government Program (SGP) is the Philippines' program for pupil governments in elementary schools & student governments in secondary schools of the Department of Education, under the Office of the Undersecretary for Regional Operations. It is the foremost co-curricular student organization authorized to implement pertinent programs, projects, and activities in Philippine schools as mandated by the Department of Education.

The Philippines has a complex student union with different names such as student government, the term used in all public secondary schools and some of the universities and/or colleges and student council for most of the colleges/universities.

The Center for Students and Co-Curricular Affairs (CSCA) was established in 1996 in order to further facilitate co-curricular work of student councils in the country and mold them to be better leaders. In 2003, the Supreme Student Governments were institutionalized starting with the establishment of the National Federation of Supreme Student Governments (NFSSG) with David Maulas of Bohol as its first National Federation President elected during the 1st National Leadership Training for Student Government Officers (NLTSGO). An institutionalized Constitution and By Laws of the Supreme Student Governments were enforced through a Department Order No. 43, s. 2005, then revised in 2009 as per Department Order No. 79, s. 2009. The second National Federation officers were elected September 2012 with Raja Barber of Oriental Mindoro as the 2nd National Federation President. In 2019 as per Department Order No. 85, s. 2019. The final las set of National Federation officers were elected August 2019 with Jericho Ryan Chiong of Cagayan de Oro Misamis Oriental o as the last National Federation President.

In 2014, through Department Order No. 47, s. 2014 the Constitution and By-Laws of Supreme Pupil Governments in elementary schools and Supreme Student Governments in secondary schools around the country were unified. This marks the year where the Supreme Pupil Governments are institutionalized. Currently the program is now under the Office of the Undersecretary for Regional Operations.

=== National federation presidents ===
THE NATIONAL FEDERATION PRESIDENTS
Name	City	School	Province
David Maulas	Tagbilaran	Tagbilaran National High School(TNHS)	Bohol
Raja Barber	Calapan	Calapan National High School (CNHS)	Oriental Mindoro
Jericho Ryan Chiong	Cagayan de oro city	Bulua National High School (BNHS)	Misamis Oriental (Note: Figures include the independent city of Cagayan de Oro.)

=== Division Federated Supreme Student Government Officers ===
The following are the list of Public High Schools DFSSG officers in Cagayan de Oro.

SY 2019-2021

- PRESIDENT - BULUA NATIONAL HIGH SCHOOL
  Jericho Ryan Chiong
- VICE PRESIDENT - BALULANG NATIONAL HIGH SCHOOL
  Princess Khylaa Racman
- SECRETARY - CAMAMAN-AN NATIONAL HIGH SCHOOL
  Cyra Torres Cagata
- TREASURER KAUSWAGAN NATIONAL HIGH SCHOOL
  Aiza Mae Tenio
- AUDITOR FS - CATANICO NATIONAL HIGH SCHOOL
  Eric john Neri
- PUBLIC INFORMATION OFFICER - LUMBIA NATIONAL HIGH SCHOOL
  Nikka Magic Adriano
- PEACE OFFICER - BALUBAL NATIONAL HIGH SCHOOL
  Harold John Payla

SY 2018-2019

- PRESIDENT - GUSA REGIONAL SCIENCE HIGH SCHOOL
  Angel Ampo
- VICE PRESIDENT - BALULANG NATIONAL HIGH SCHOOL
  Vince Noel Botona
- SECRETARY - INDAHAG NATIONAL HIGH SCHOOL
  Grace Jean Pait
- TREASURER - ANGELES SISTERS NATIONAL HIGH SCHOOL
  Mary Jane Dampog
- AUDITOR - AGUSAN NATIONAL HIGH SCHOOL
  Angelica Karingal
- PUBLIC INFORMATION OFFICER - BUGO NATIONAL HIGH SCHOOL
  Frances Pauline Del Calzada
- PEACE OFFICER - P.N ROA NATIONAL HIGH SCHOOL
  Allan Lloyd Martinez

=== Science High Schools ===
The following is a list of science high schools in Cagayan de Oro.

- Gusa Regional Science High School - X
  J.R. Borja Ext., Gusa, Cagayan de Oro

=== Private High Schools ===
The following is a list of private high schools in Cagayan de Oro.

- Abbas Orchard Montessori School
  Alwana Business Park, Cugman, Cagayan de Oro
- Angelicum Learning Center
  Carmen, Cagayan de Oro
- Asian Business Cabletow Cooperative Academy (ABCCA), Inc.
  Corrales Avenue, Cagayan de Oro
- Assumption Montessori School
  Balulang, Cagayan de Oro
- Blessed Child Academy
  Carmen, Cagayan de Oro
- Blessed Mother College
  Iponan, Cagayan de Oro
- Capitol University Basic Education Department
  Gusa, Cagayan de Oro
- Cagayan de Oro College
  Max Suniel St., Carmen, Cagayan de Oro
- City College of Cagayan de Oro
  Barangay Agusan, District 2 (Dr. Jestoni P. Babia, its first-ever college president), Cagayan de Oro
- Corpus Christi School
  Macasandig, Cagayan de Oro
  Pueblo de Oro, Cagayan de Oro
- Divine Mercy School
  Villa Vicente, Cagayan de Oro
- Immanuel Mission International School
  Dagong Carmen, Cagayan de Oro
- International School
  Kauswagan, Cagayan de Oro
- Kong Hua School
  Kauswagan, Cagayan de Oro
- Liceo de Cagayan University
  Carmen, Cagayan de Oro
- Lourdes College
  Macasandig, Cagayan de Oro
- Marymount Academy
  Balongis, Balulang, Cagayan de Oro
- Merry Child School
  Zone 7, Bulua, Cagayan de Oro
- Montessori De Oro
  Tiano-Echem Sts., Cagayan de Oro
- Nanuri International School
  Taguanao, Indahag, Cagayan de Oro
- Oro Christian Grace School
  Macasandig, Cagayan de Oro
- Philippine Southfield School
  Bugo, Cagayan de Oro
- Philadelphian Christian Academy
  Lumbia, Cagayan de Oro
- Pilgrim Christian College
  Capistrano St., Cagayan de Oro
- Sacred Heart Academy
  Bugo, Cagayan de Oro
- Sacred Heart of Jesus Montessori School
  C.M. Recto Avenue, Cagayan de Oro
  J.R. Borja Ext., Gusa, Cagayan de Oro
- Shekinah Glory Christian Academy
  Corrales-J.R. Borja Sts., Cagayan de Oro
- Southern Philippines College
  Julio Pacana St., Cagayan de Oro
- St. Mary's Academy of Carmen
  Carmen, Cagayan de Oro
- St. Mary's School
  Mandumol, Macasandig, Cagayan de Oro
- Sta. Cecilia Learning Center
  Kauswagan, Cagayan de Oro
- Vita Basic Education School
  Bulua, Cagayan de Oro
- Xavier University High School
  Pueblo de Oro, Cagayan de Oro

== Association of private secondary schools in cagayan de oro & misamis oriental history ==
The Association of Private Secondary Schools in Cagayan de Oro and Misamis Oriental – Federation of Student Governments, is the union of Private Secondary Student Governments in Cagayan de Oro and the province of Misamis Oriental. APSSCOMOR-FSG traced its roots due to the call of four(4) different student governments: Merry Child School, Little Me Academy, Millenium Christian Academy, and Liceo de Cagayan University Junior High School, who saw the need for the Private Secondary Student Governments to unite in a cause of collaboration to advance their ideals on the empowerment of Students.

With the help and guidance of the Association of Private Secondary Schools in Cagayan de Oro and Misamis Oriental (APSSCOMOR), the organization of Private Secondary School Administrators, the Student Governments from different Private Institutions converged in an event, thus created the APSSCOMOR-FSG and elected its first officers under the leadership of Mr. Kyle Chester J. Cotacte, who also led the four student governments that called for the creation of the federation. During its first year, with the guidance of Mr. Jessie Andallasa, the FSG's Moderator and Member of the APSSCOMOR Board, the federation sought out to connect with its member student governments. The prime achievement also of the first administration of the federation was earning a seat in the Oro Youth Development Council (OYDC) - the Highest Policy Recommending Body on youth affairs in Cagayan de Oro. It enables the federation to participate in lobbying policies such as the Oro Youth Code of 2018 and the Students Rights and Welfare Ordinance (STRAW Ordinance) which the latter being proposed in the city council by the OYDC.

=== Association of Private Secondary Schools In Cagayan de Oro & Misamis Oriental-Federation of Student Governments ===
The following are the list of Private High Schools APSCOMMOR-FSG officers in Cagayan de Oro & Misamis Oriental.

2019-2020
- PRESIDENT - XAVIER UNIVERSITY-SENIOR HIGH SCHOOL
  Justin Mar Alvear
- VICE PRESIDENT - CORPUS CHRISI SCHOOL
  Marielle Aubrey Go
- SECRETARY - MERRY CHILD SCHOOL
  Karlin Salcedo
- TREASURER - DON MARIANO CANOY COLLEGES
  Alvin Cahoy
- AUDITOR - STI COLLEGE
  Joemaeble Bernaldez
- WEST DISTRICT 1 - ANGELICUM LEARNING CENTER
  Ethelle Franchette
- WEST DISTRICT 2 REPRESENTATIVE - SUMMERHILL SCHOOL
  Alnia Sangcaan
- EAST DISTRICT 1 REPRESENTATIVE - SACRED HEART OF JESUS MONTESSORI SCHOOL
  N/A
- EAST DISTRICT 2 REPRESENTATIVE - SACRED HEART ACADEMY
  Dianarh Lofranco
- SOUTHWEST 1 REPRESENTATIVE - NANRI INTERNATIONAL SCHOOL
  Lady Borres
- CENTRAL REPRESENTATIVE - MARYMOUNT ACADEMY
  Nor-ain Macmod
- INFORMATION OFFICER - KING OF ZION SCHOOL
  Cherry Ramirez
- INFORMATION OFFICER - LIVING SPRINGS INSTITUTE OF TECHNOLOGY
  Nyl Frances Bernil
- INFORMATION OFFICER - MELLENIUM CHRISTIAN ACADEMY
  John Ray Villanueva
- INFORMATION OFFICER - NOAH'S ARK SCHOOL
  Fiona Cuyuca
- INFORMATION OFFICER - PHILIPPINE SOUTHFIELD SCHOOL
  Nyl Frances Bernil

2018-2019

- PRESIDENT - XAVIER UNIVERSITY- SENIOR HIGH SCHOOL
  Reneila Eguia
- VICE PRESIDENT - CORPUS CHRISTI SCHOOL
  Marielle Go

2017-2018

- PRESIDENT - MERRY CHILD SCHOOL
  Kyle Chester Cotacte
- VICE PRESIDENT - CORPUS CHRISI SCHOOL
  Jenealle Micah Llubit
- SECRETARY - PILGRIM CHRISTIAN COLLEGE
  Saldivar Zeefpril
- TREASURER - SACRED HEART OF MONTESSORI
  Renchen Algodon
- AUDITOR FS - PRIOS-ICSS
  Nicole Ares
- WEST DISTRICT 1 LEADER - Xavier University High School
  Sofia Allyson Sy
- WEST DISTRICT 2 REPRESENTATIVE - MARYMOUNT ACADEMY
  Christine Galarido
- EAST DISTRICT 1 REPRESENTATIVE - SUMMERHILL SCHOOL
  Joan Grace Espinosa
- EAST DISTRICT 2 REPRESENTATIVE - SACRED HEART ACADEMY
  Dianarh Lofranco
- NORTH 1 REPRESENTATIVE - NOAH'S ARK CHRISTIAN SCHOOL
  Zoe Nicole Lawag
- NORTH 2 REPRESENTATIVE - LITTLE ME ACADEMY
  Elda Galacio
- SOUTHWEST REPRESENTATIVE - IMMANUEL MISSION SCHOOL
  Lady Borres
- SOUTH REPRESENTATIVE - ST.MAR'S SCHOOL
  Jose Maria Argayoso
- CENTRAL REPRESENTATIVE - LIVING SPRING INSTITUTE OF TECHNOLOGY
  Nicole Pastrano
- MIS OR EAST REPRESENTATIVE - KING OF ZION SCHOOL
  Cherry Ramirez
- MIS OR WEST REPRESENTATIVE - BRIGHT ROCK SCHOOL
  Nyl Frances Bernil
