= Romanian Olympiad in Informatics =

The Romanian Olympiad in Informatics (Romanian: Olimpiada Națională de Informatică, ONI) is an annual competitive programming contest for secondary school students in Romania. It gathers about 300 high-school students (9th to 12th grade) and about 160 gymnasium students (5th to 8th grade).

The contest takes place over two days, in sessions of 3–5 hours each, and consists of providing computationally efficient solutions to one to four problems of an algorithmic nature, in the C or C++ programming languages. Contestants compete individually. To participate, students must first qualify within their school, then town/city (if there are enough interested contestants), then county. At the end of the Olympiad, a special contest further selects the top ~20 students for the International Olympiad in Informatics (IOI). Since 1990, Romanian students have won 38 gold medals at the IOI, ranking the country #6 worldwide as of 2026.

Similarly to the IOI, each solution is checked against some test cases for the problem, each with its own value, totalling to 100 per problem. Contestants can get grading information for their submission during the test by uploading them to the CMS (Contest Management System) hosted on SEPI's server, which is the same software used at the IOI. Other network traffic is blocked.

Oftentimes a problem can have multiple subtasks which are different versions of the same idea and multiple types of algorithm are required to solve them all.

== History ==
The first Romanian Olympiad in Informatics was held in 1978 and consisted of a hand-written portion, and a computer portion, the latter giving a choice of programming language among Fortran, COBOL and ASSIRIS.

=== Pandemic disruption ===
Due to the pandemic, the 2020 edition of the contest was cancelled. Nevertheless, to insure the continued participation of Romania at international and regional competitions, a team selection event was held.

Similarly, the 2021 edition of the contest was also cancelled. In this year, the Society for Excellence and Performance in Informatics (SEPI) held the SEPI Olympiad online, for the first time using a live, full-feedback evaluation mechanism for contestant's source code.

=== Editions ===
Recent editions
Year	High school	Middle School
2025	Ploiești, 13-18 April, 360 contestants	Botoșani, 14-18 April, 360 contestants
2024	București, 23-28 April, 410 contestants	Iași, 22-26 April, 316 contestants
2023	București, 4-9 April, 362 contestants	Târgu Mureș, 4-8 April, 245 contestants
2022	Online, 3 April	Online, 2 April
2021	Online (OSEPI), 7 April	Online (OSEPI), 8 April
2020	Cancelled	Cancelled
2019	Suceava, 355 participants, 29 April - 4 May	București, 291 participants, 22 April - 27 April
2018	Constanța, 29 March - 2 April	Târgu Jiu, 4 April - 7 April
2017	Brașov, 340 participants, 20–25 April	Sibiu, 27 April - 30 April

Other editions included:

- 2016 – Bucharest, 21–24 April (gymnasium)
- 2015 – Târgovişte, 330 high-school students, 3–8 April
- 2014 – Slobozia, 220 gymnasium students, 10–14 April
- 2013 – Timișoara, 30 March – 5 April
- 2010 – Slatina, 126 gymnasium students, 30 January – 2 February, and Constanta, 287 high-school students in April

== Phases ==
Some schools organise a per-school qualification test; the existence and the details of it are school policy.

=== Local (town/city) phase ===
This is only organised in some counties, where there are enough interested students to warrant selection. Usually its format is similar to the county phase, but of easier difficulty and may contain fewer problems.

=== County phase ===
This phase is mandatory for participation in the national phase. In each county or sector of Bucharest an exam centre is chosen, which is a school in the county seat and the test is held with the same problems for a given grade in the whole country. Gymnasium students have to solve two problems in three hours, whereas high-school students have to solve three problems in four hours. While each problem is worth 100 points, as per regulations by the Ministry of Education, for the county phase these scores are divided by 20, multiplied by 9 and added to 10 (so the range of scores for that phase is 10-100 for the whole test).

=== National phase ===
Students pass the county phase in two cases:

1. For each grade, the best-performing student coming from each county is automatically qualified, as long as they have obtained the minimum score of 60 (on the 10-100 scale).
2. The students not qualified by now are put in a national leaderboard, and the first 43 students (or fewer, if no 43 students have managed to obtain a score of 60) are qualified as well.

Before 2026, the 10-100 scale was not used in the county phase and the minimum score was 80 on the 0-200 scale.

The national phase is held in one city for gymnasium and in another for high-school and consists, for all grades, of 3 problems with a time of 4 hours, the problems being specific to each grade. These have a higher difficulty than the county phase and it is common for no students to reach the maximum score.

=== International team selection phase ===
The first half of the national phase's leaderboard, for each grade, is sent to this. Gymnasium students get one test with 3 problems to solve in 4 hours, and high-school students get two days of exam, each with 3 problems in 5 hours. For each cycle (gymnasium or high-school), the two best students from each grade are selected, then the team is filled with other students in descending leaderboard order regardless of the grade, up to the extended team size, which is 16 or 25 students for gymnasium and high-school, respectively. The same problems are used for all grades in each category.

=== Team filtering camps ===
Camps are held in various cities around the country, where eventually the teams for the various international competitions (including the IOI) are formed.

== See also ==
- International Olympiad in Informatics
- Central European Olympiad in Informatics, founded by and often hosted in Romania
