= Corpus Christi School =

Corpus Christi School may refer to:

- Corpus Christi School (Hobart) in Tasmania, Australia
- Corpus Christi School (Ottawa), Ontario, Canada
- Corpus Christi School, New York City
- Corpus Christi School (Cagayan de Oro City), in Mindanao, Philippines, one of Cagayan de Oro's high schools
- Pallikoodam, an experimental school in India formerly known as Corpus Christi School

== See also ==
- Corpus Christi College (disambiguation)
