= British Informatics Olympiad =

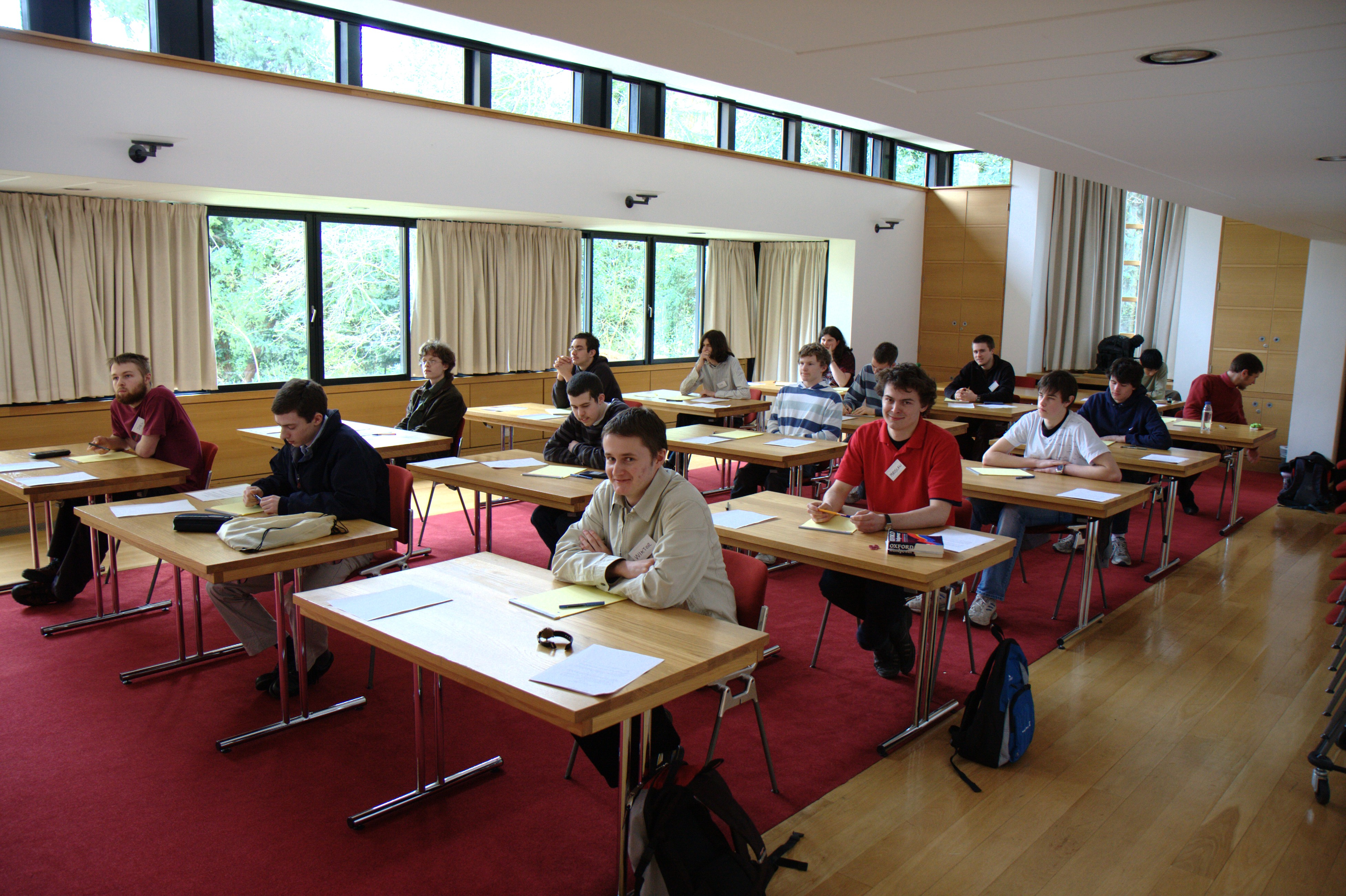
Participants at the final round of the British Informatics Olympiad 2008 at Trinity College, Cambridge

The British Informatics Olympiad (BIO) is an annual computer-programming competition for secondary and sixth-form students. Any student under 19 who is in full-time pre-university education and resident in mainland Britain is eligible to compete. The competition is composed of two rounds - a preliminary 3-question, 3-hour exam paper sat at the participant's school and a final round. The top-15 performing students each year are invited to the finals (currently hosted by Trinity College, Cambridge) where they attempt to solve several more difficult problems, involving programming. In the past, there also existed written problems, but these have been phased out in recent years. Typically a score of 75 to 90 out of 100 is required on the first round of the competition to reach the final.

Of these fifteen, four are chosen for the British team to participate in the International Olympiad in Informatics, and one is chosen as a reserve. Additionally, two female participants are chosen for the British team to participate in the European Girls’ Olympiad in Informatics (EGOI), and one is chosen as reserve. Furthermore, since 2024, the IOI and EGOI teams alongside their reserves and one additional participant all participate as a team of 9 in the Western European Olympiad in Informatics (WEOI).

Mark schemes are available for all round 1 past papers at the competition's official site, as well as problem statements for all round 1 and round 2 past papers. Official worked solutions are available for round 1 papers in the years 1995-1999 and 2004. Unofficial solutions are available for round 1 papers from 2000-2025 and some round 2 questions in the years 2016-2023.

== Competition format ==
In the British Informatics Olympiad round 1, there are 3 questions to be completed in 3 hours. Each question has a primary programming question that is worth the bulk of the points. The first question is designed to be easily completed by anyone, whilst the rest are significantly more difficult. The programming part A of each question is followed by smaller and simpler questions that can be answered through a variety of techniques like brute force testing, logical reasoning, simulation, and combinatorics knowledge. The competition can be done in any programming language in any environment, sat in the participant's own school.

The round 2 consists of 4 much harder questions, to be answered during a 5-hour exam in Cambridge, to which students may bring their own device, programming in C/C++ only. You are allowed 5 submissions to an online grader which will provide limited feedback on your solutions.

== Sponsors ==
The BIO has been sponsored by video-games developer Lionhead Studios since 2002. In the past, it has also been sponsored by Data Connection and Jane Street.

== See also ==
- Young Scientists of the Year
- International Olympiad in Informatics
