= LHC@home =

Volunteer computing project researching particle simulations for LHC development

- LHC@home screensaver
- Initial release: SixTrack: 1 September 2004; Test4Theory: 1 August 2011
- Development status: Active
- Operating system: Cross-platform
- Platform: BOINC
- As of: September 2024
- Average performance: 52 TFLOPS
- Active users: 1,260
- Total users: 178,244
- Active hosts: 3,633
- Total hosts: 577,548
- Website: lhcathome.cern.ch/lhcathome/

LHC@home is a volunteer computing project researching particle physics that uses the Berkeley Open Infrastructure for Network Computing (BOINC) platform. The project's computing power is utilized by physicists at CERN in support of the Large Hadron Collider and other experimental particle accelerators.

The project is run with the help of over 1,260 active volunteer users contributing more than 3,000 computers processing at a combined 52 teraFLOPS as of September 2024. The project is cross-platform, and runs on a variety of computer hardware configurations.

== Applications ==
The LHC@home project currently runs four applications—Atlas, CMS, SixTrack, and Test4Theory—which deal with different aspects of research conducted in LHC such as calculating particle beam stability and simulating proton collisions. Atlas, CMS, and Test4Theory use VirtualBox, an x86 virtualization software package.

=== Atlas ===
Atlas uses volunteer computing power to run simulations of the ATLAS experiment. It can be run in VirtualBox or natively on Linux.

=== Beauty ===
Beauty (LHCb) compared the decay of bottom quarks (b) and bottom antiquarks (b̅), which also known as beauty quarks. The participation of volunteers in the application was suspended indefinitely on 19 November 2018.

=== CMS ===
The CMS application (formerly a standalone project called CMS@Home) allows users to run simulations for the Compact Muon Solenoid experiment on their computers.

=== SixTrack ===
SixTrack was first introduced as a beta on 1 September 2004 and a record 1000 users signed up within 24 hours. The application went public, with a 5000 user limit, on September 29 to commemorate CERN's 50th anniversary. Currently there is no user limit and qualification.

SixTrack was developed by Frank Schmidt of the CERN Accelerators and Beams Department and produces results that are essential for verifying the long term stability of the high energy particles in the LHC. Lyn Evans, head of the LHC project, stated that "the results from SixTrack are really making a difference, providing us with new insights into how the LHC will perform".

=== Test4Theory ===
The Test4Theory application allows volunteers to run simulations of high energy particle collisions on their home computers. These simulations use theoretical models based on the Standard Model of particle physics, and are calculated using Monte Carlo methods. The theoretical models have adjustable parameters and the aim is that a given set of parameters (called a "tune") will fit the widest possible range of experimental results.

The Test4Theory results are therefore submitted to a database which contains a very wide set of experimental data from many accelerator experiments worldwide, including of course experiments at the Large Hadron Collider. The Theory Unit at CERN runs the MCPLots project, which run the database and the theoretical fitting process.

== See also ==
- Citizen Cyberscience Centre
- List of volunteer computing projects
- Worldwide LHC Computing Grid
