= Southern de Oro Philippines College =

Private college in Cagayan de Oro, Philippines

Southern Philippines College
- Other name: SPC
- Motto: Service to God and Humanity
- Type: Private, nonsectarian
- Established: October 2, 1982
- Location: Julio Pacana St., Licuan, Cagayan de Oro, Misamis Oriental, Philippines; 8°29′19″N 124°38′59″E
- Colors: Maroon and gold
- Website: spccdo.edu.ph
- Location in Mindanao Location in the Philippines

Southern Philippines College (SPC) is a private domestic corporation, non-sectarian and co-educational institution.

== History ==
The school was established upon the proposal of Engr. Apolinar Y. Garcia and Atty. Claudio M. Aguilar in partnership with during the meeting of the Board of Directors of then Bermuda Shopping Center now known as Benito-Raymunda Realty Corporation in August 1981. The idea was to develop the conjugal real properties of the late Don Benito R. Garcia and Dona Raymunda Yabut Garcia.

On October 2, 1981, the school was formally approved by the incorporators, namely: Engr. and Mrs. Apolinar Garcia, Brgy. Captain and Mrs. George Garcia, Mrs. Adelina Nacalaban, Mr. and Mrs. Venusto Y. Garcia, Mr. and Mrs. Alfredo Y. Garcia, Dr. and Mrs. Hernando T. Mejia, Dr. and Mrs. Bernardo Resoso, Atty. and Mrs. Claudio M. Aguilar, and Don Benito R. Garcia. On October 19, 1981, the school was registered with the Securities and Exchange Commission as Southern Philippines Academy, now Southern de Oro Philippines College, in its Articles of Incorporation under SEC. Reg. No. 101440.

== Academic programs ==
=== Undergraduate programs ===
CHED/TESDA/DepEd Accredited Courses:

- Bachelor of Science in Criminology
- Bachelor of Science in Information Technology
- Bachelor of Science in Hotel and Restaurant Management
- Bachelor of Science in Tourism Management
- Bachelor of Science in Elementary Education
- Bachelor of Science in Secondary Education
- Bachelor of Science in Business Administration Major in:
  - Marketing Management
  - Financial Management
  - Business Economics
  - Human Resource Development
- Bachelor of Science in Entrepreneurship
- Bachelor of Arts in English
- Bachelor of Arts in Economics

=== Graduate programs ===
- Master of Arts in Educational Management
- Master of Arts in Secondary Education

=== Short-term courses ===
- Professional Education
- Caregiving NC II
- Housekeeping NC II
- Food and Beverage Services NC II

Other short-term programs also available

=== Basic education ===
- Pre-school
- Elementary
- Junior High School

=== Senior High School ===
Academic Track

- Accounting, Business and Management (ABM)
- Science, Technology, Engineering, and Mathematics (STEM)
- Humanities and Social Sciences (HUMSS)
- General Academics (GAs)

Tech-Voc Track

- Maritime
- Home Economics
- Information and Communications Technology

Other College degree with bridging program

SPC also offers Certificate in Professional Teaching. Graduates of the 2-year Associate program in HRM can have their subjects credited and proceed to Bachelor of Science in HRM.
