= Colorado Community Church =

Church in Aurora Colorado, United States

- Colorado Community Church
- 39.681243°N 104.827017°W
- Location: Aurora, Colorado, United States
- Country: United States
- Website: www.coloradocommunity.org

History
- Founded: 1993

Colorado Community Church is an interdenominational, multi-cultural church located in Aurora, Colorado. The church is pastored by Rev. Robert Gelinas and was ranked by Outreach Magazine as the 16th fastest-growing church in the United States in 2023.

== History ==
In December of 2019, Colorado Community Church relocated to a larger building at 14000 E Jewell Ave, which serves as a "basecamp" for ministry in Aurora and the greater Denver Metro area.
