= Cagayan de Oro City Central School =

Public elementary school in Cagayan de Oro, Philippines

Coordinates: 8°28′49″N 124°38′46″E

The Cagayan de Oro City Central School (CCS) is an elementary public school located in Cagayan de Oro, Philippines.

== History ==
The Cagayan de Oro City Central School opened for the children of Misamis Oriental in 1909. One of the oldest structures built in this school, the Gabaldon Building, still stands.

In 1909, there were already 51 Gabaldon Buildings throughout the Philippines, including the Gabaldon Building in Cagayan Intermediate School (former name of the Cagayan de Oro City Central School). The Gabaldon Building of Cagayan de Oro City Central School was inaugurated on August 28, 1911, according to the Cagayan de Oro City Historical Commission.

The construction was inspired by Isauro Gabaldon, the deputy to the First Philippine Assembly in 1909. He was noted for promulgating the Education Act of 1801, better known as the Gabaldon Law, endorsing the construction of school buildings across the archipelago.

The land for construction of Cagayan Intermediate was donated by the philanthropist Tirso Neri – the first municipal presidente or mayor of Cagayan during the American colonial period in 1901-1904. The donated lot has a total lot area of 37,766 sq. m. bounded on the north by the Pelaez Sports Center which used to be the stable of the donor, and Don Apolinar Velez Street on the eastern side.

The Gabaldon building was at first used as a Multigrade building occupied by Grade I to VI and was the first venue of the first significant school event – the graduation in 1916. The Department of Education and the Heritage Conservation Society embarked on a project to restore the historic school building through the Heritage Schoolhouse Restoration Program in 2009. The Gabaldon building has now been renovated.

== Current use ==
The school’s development from a single schoolhouse continues. It is currently an elementary school attended by children from Cagayan City and some neighboring towns.
