= International Olympiad in Informatics =

Annual programming competition

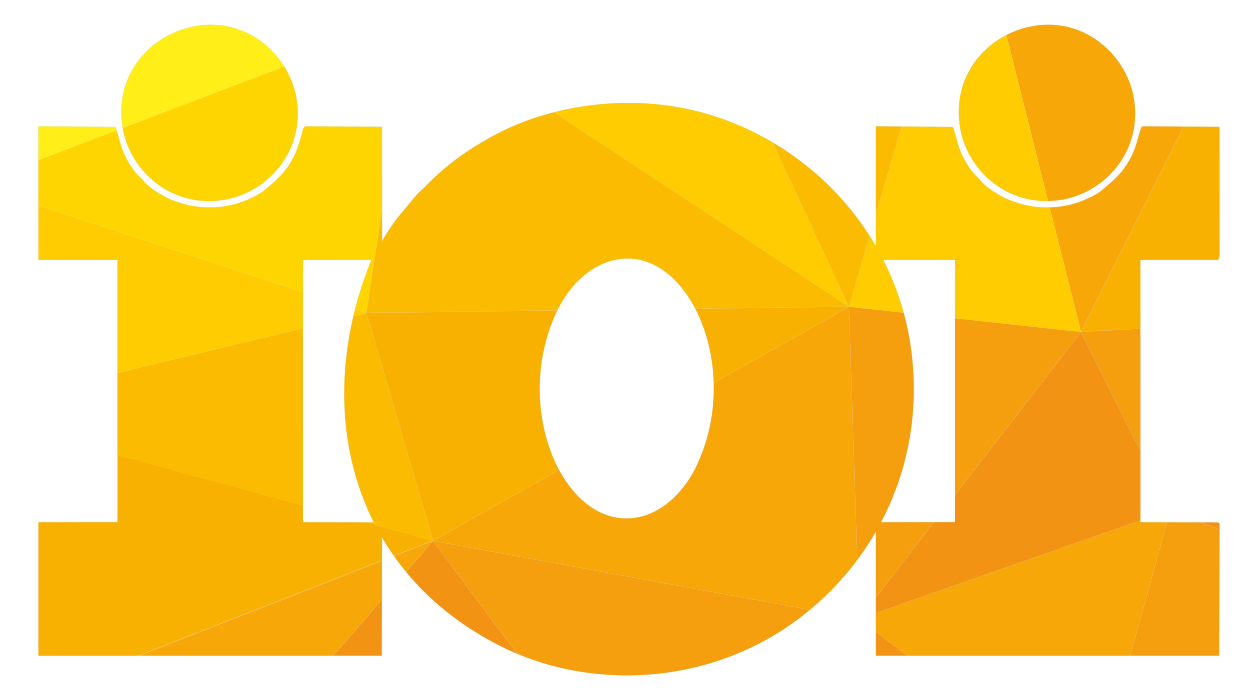
The logo of the International Olympiad in Informatics

The International Olympiad in Informatics (IOI) is an annual competitive programming competition and one of the International Science Olympiads for secondary school students. The first IOI was held in 1989 in Pravetz, Bulgaria.

Each country sends a team of up to four students, plus one team leader, one deputy leader, and guests. Students in each country are selected for their country's team through national computing contests. Students at the IOI compete on an individual basis. There is no official team ranking.

The contest consists of two days of solving six complicated algorithmic tasks by writing computer programs in C++. All task materials are published on each year's contest website soon after the competition ends.

== Competition structure and participation ==
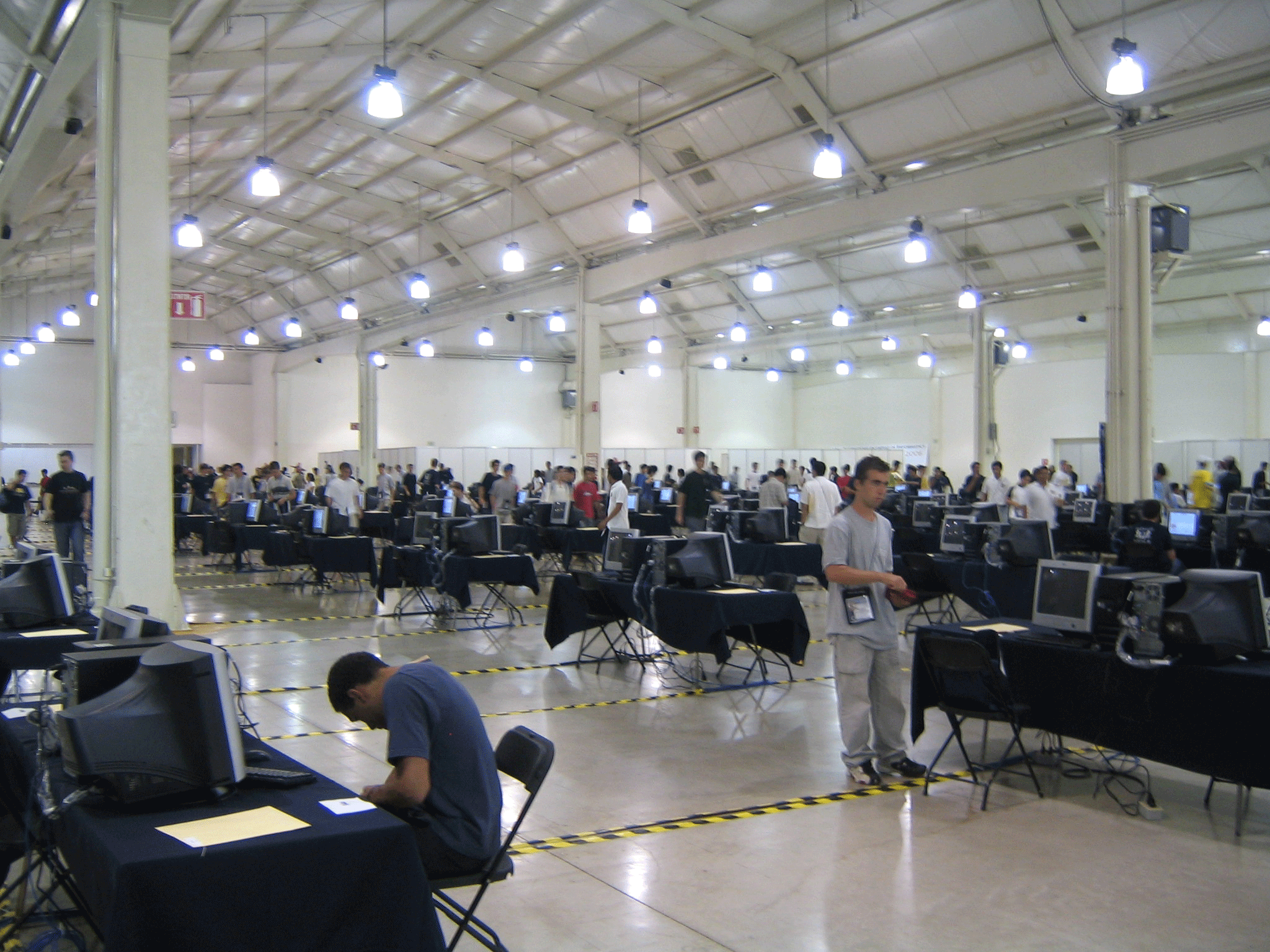
The competition room at the IOI 2006

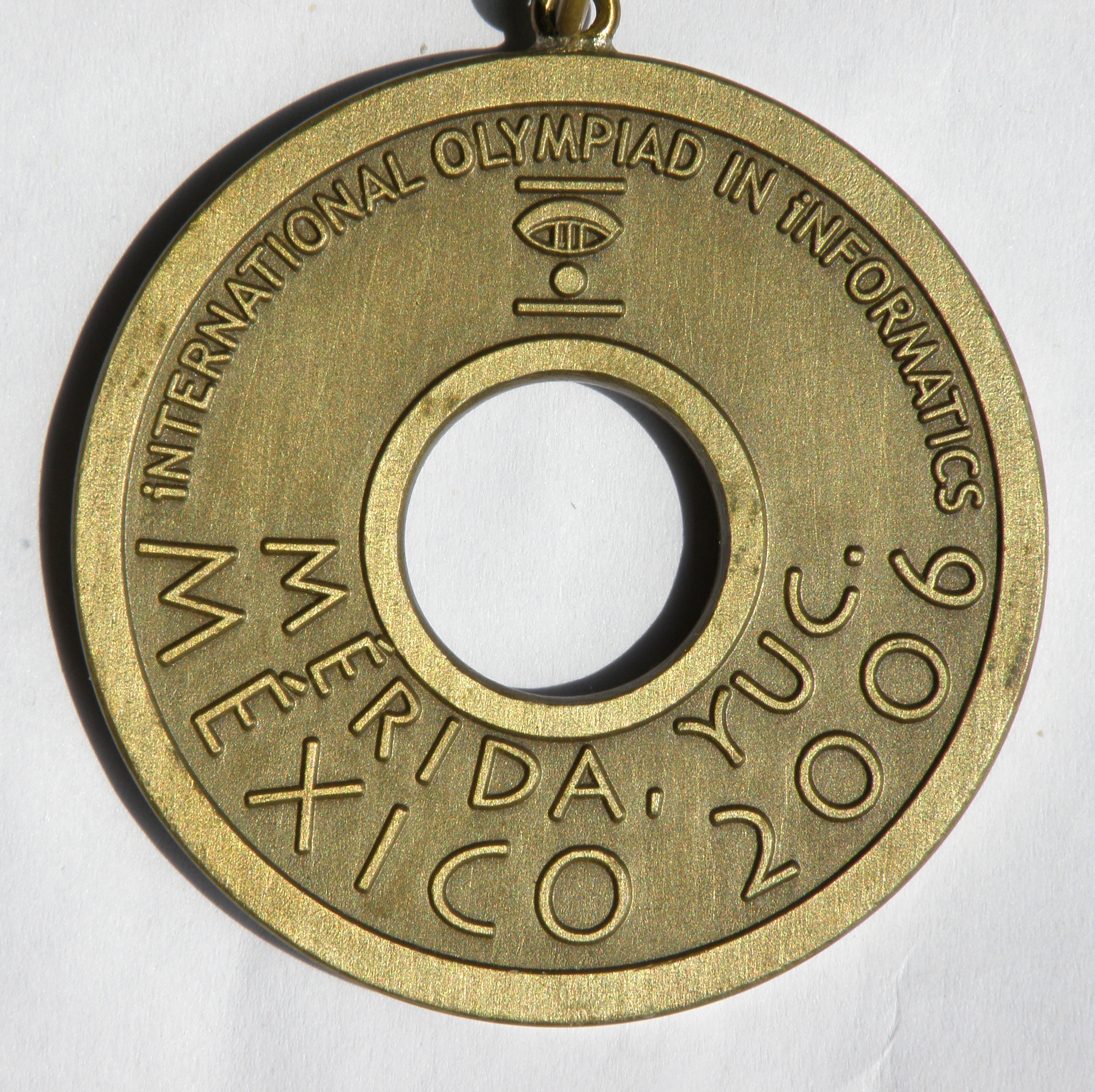
Obverse

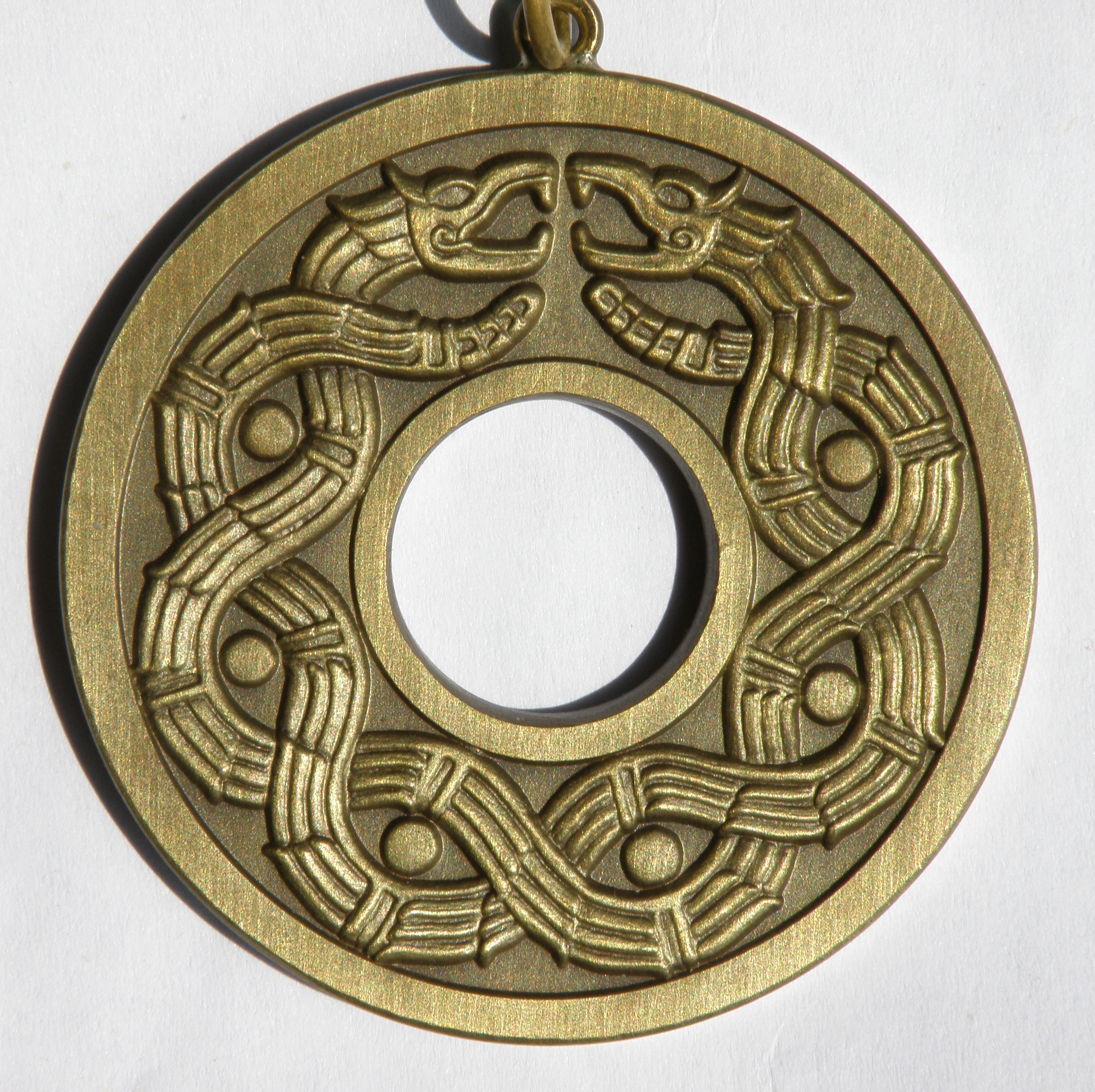
Back

A bronze medal from IOI 2006 in Mexico

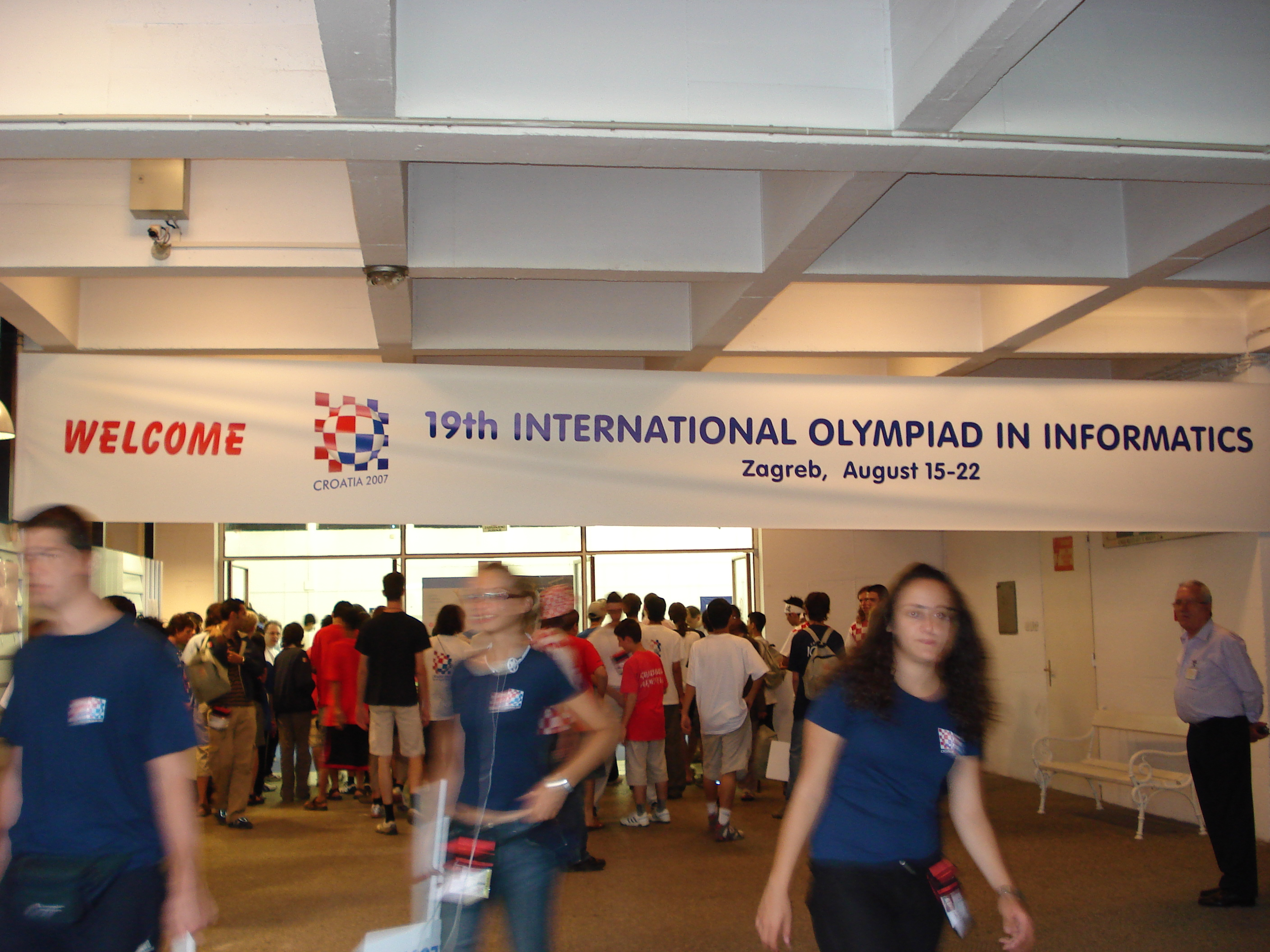
In front of the competition room at the IOI 2007

On each of the two competition days, the competitors are typically given three problems which they have to solve in five hours. Each student works on their own to solve the problems with no outside help, specifically no communication with other contestants, books, web access, etc. Contestants are typically allowed to bring non-programmable wired keyboards and mice. Usually to solve a task the contestant has to write a computer program (in C++) and submit it before the five-hour competition time ends. The program is graded based on secret test data. Since IOI 2010, tasks are divided into subtasks with graduated difficulty, and points are awarded only when all tests for a particular subtask yield correct results, within specific time and memory limits. In some cases, the contestant's program has to interact with a secret computer library, which allows problems where the input is not fixed, but depends on the program's actions – for example in game problems (a.k.a. interactive problems). Another type of problem has the inputs publicly available, for these, the contestants have to submit an output file instead of a program, and it is up to them whether they obtain the output files by writing a program (possibly exploiting special characteristics of the input), or by hand, or by a combination of these means. Pascal has been removed as an available programming language as of 2019.^{:11}

IOI 2010 for the first time had a live web scoreboard with real-time provisional results. Submissions will be scored as soon as possible during the contest, and the results posted. Contestants will be aware of their scores, but not others', and may resubmit to improve their scores. Starting from 2012, IOI has been using the Contest Management System (CMS) for developing and monitoring the contest.

The scores from the two competition days and all problems are summed up separately for each contestant. Medals are awarded depending on their relative total score. The top 50% of the contestants are awarded medals, such that the relative number of gold : silver : bronze : no medal is approximately 1:2:3:6 (thus 1/12 of the contestants get a gold medal).

Prior to IOI 2010, students who did not receive medals did not have their scores published, although the scores of students who did not receive medals are still not available in the official results, they are known from the live web scoreboard. In IOI 2012 the top 3 nations ranked by aggregate score (Russia, China and USA) were subsequently awarded during the closing ceremony.

Analysis of female performance shows 77.9% of women obtain no medal, while 49.2% of men obtain no medal. "The average female participation was 4.4% in 1989–1994 and 2.2% in 1996–2014." It also suggests much higher participation of women on the national level, claiming sometimes double-digit percentages in total participation on the first stage. President of the IOI (2011-2014), Richard Forster, says the competition has difficulty attracting women and that in spite of trying to solve it, "none of us have hit on quite what the problem is, let alone the solution." The European Girls’ Olympiad in Informatics (EGOI), which was first held in 2021, was started with the goal of increasing female participation at IOI and other Informatics Olympiads.

At the 2017 competition held in Iran, the Israeli team was initially not allowed to compete. After Israel appealed, Innopolis University (Russian Federation) offered to host the Israeli team offsite.^{:11} Due to visa issues, the full USA team was unable to attend, although one contestant Zhezheng Luo was able to attend by traveling with the Chinese team and winning gold medal and 3rd place in standings.

In IOI 2019 held in Azerbaijan, the Armenia team did not participate due to the dispute between the two countries, despite the guarantees provided and official invitation letter sent by the host Azerbaijan.

Due to the COVID-19 pandemic, both the IOI 2020 and IOI 2021, originally scheduled to be hosted by Singapore, were held as online contests. The IOI 2022, hosted by Indonesia, was held as a hybrid event, with around 25% of the contestants participating online.

In response to the invasion of Ukraine, students from Russia and Belarus can only participate as individuals under the IOI flag but not as national delegations starting from IOI 2022, and they would only participate online for IOI 2022. From 2023 onwards they would participate in person, but under the IOI flag.

In response to the conflict and humanitarian crisis in Gaza, over two thirds of the delegations voted to sanction Israel so that starting with IOI 2025, Israeli students can only participate as individuals under the IOI flag rather as a national delegation.

At the 2026 IOI in Tashkent, Yotam Budnik, a student from Israel, won a gold medal but was disqualified after displaying an Israeli flag during the awards ceremony, which violated the sanctions introduced in 2024. His result was removed from the official rankings and his certificate was revoked. Budnik said that he wanted to protest the restrictions imposed on Israeli contestants, which he considered unfair, and that he believed politics should not be involved in a computer science competition.

== Members ==
- Albania
- Algeria
- Argentina
- Armenia
- Australia
- Austria
- Azerbaijan
- Bangladesh
- Belarus
- Belgium
- Bolivia
- Bosnia and Herzegovina
- Brazil
- Bulgaria
- Canada
- Chile
- China
- Colombia
- Croatia
- Cuba
- Cyprus
- Czech Republic
- Denmark
- Dominican Republic
- Ecuador
- Egypt
- El Salvador
- Estonia
- Finland
- France
- Georgia
- Germany
- Greece
- Hong Kong
- Hungary
- Iceland
- India
- Indonesia
- Iran
- Ireland
- Israel
- Italy
- Japan
- Jordan
- Kazakhstan
- Kyrgyzstan
- Latvia
- Libya
- Lithuania
- Luxembourg
- Macau
- Malaysia
- Mexico
- Moldova
- Mongolia
- Montenegro
- Morocco
- Netherlands
- New Zealand
- Nigeria
- North Macedonia
- Norway
- Pakistan
- Palestine
- Peru
- Philippines
- Poland
- Portugal
- Romania
- Russia
- Rwanda
- Saudi Arabia
- Serbia
- Singapore
- Slovakia
- Slovenia
- South Africa
- South Korea
- Spain
- Sri Lanka
- Sweden
- Switzerland
- Syria
- Taiwan
- Tajikistan
- Thailand
- Tunisia
- Turkey
- Turkmenistan
- Ukraine
- United Kingdom
- United States
- Uzbekistan
- Venezuela
- Vietnam

=== Former members ===
- Gabon
- Ghana
- Kuwait
- Madagascar
- Malta
- Mauritius
- Mozambique
- Sudan
- Trinidad and Tobago
- United Arab Emirates
- Zimbabwe

== Summary ==
Number	Year	Dates	Host country	Host city	Absolute Winner	Score	Results	Website
1	1989	May 16–19	Bulgaria	Pravetz	Teodor Tonchev (Bulgaria)	100/100		
2	1990	July 15–21	(Byelorussian Soviet Socialist Republic) Belarus, Soviet Union	Minsk	Tsvetomir Petrov (Bulgaria)	160/200		
3	1991	May 19–25	Greece	Athens	Igor Maly (Czechoslovakia)	196/200		
4	1992	July 11–21	Germany	Bonn	Bom Jun Kim (Republic of Korea), Fredrik Huss (Sweden), Gao Chen (China), Jittat Fakcharoenphol (Thailand), Laszlo Peter (Hungary), Matej Ondrusek (Czechoslovakia), Nathan Bronson (United States of America), Pinit Asavanuchit (Thailand), Shawn Smith (United States of America), Viet Nguyen Tuan (Vietnam), Xing Wu (China), Yunhe Yang (China), Niklas Eén (Sweden)	200/200		
5	1993	October 16–25	Argentina	Mendoza	Fredrik Huss (Sweden), Martin Mareš (Czech Republic), Mehdi Foladgar (Iran), Radu-Lucian Lupsa (Romania)	200/200		
6	1994	July 3–10	Sweden	Haninge	Victor Bargatchev (Russia)	195/200		
7	1995	June 26 – July 3	Netherlands	Eindhoven	Victor Bargatchev (Russia)	186/200		
8	1996	July 25 – August 2	Hungary	Veszprém	Daniel Kráľ (Czech Republic)	196/200		
9	1997	November 30 – December 7	South Africa	Cape Town	Vladimir Martianov (Russia)	462/600		
10	1998	September 5–12	Portugal	Setúbal	Daniel Wright (South Africa), Mihai Stroe (Romania), Vladimir Martianov (Russia), Zhunping Zhang (China)	700/700		
11	1999	October 9–16	Turkey	Antalya-Belek	Hong Chen (China)	480/600		
12	2000	September 23–30	China	Beijing	Mikhail Baoutine (Russia)	700/700		
13	2001	July 14–21	Finland	Tampere	Reid Barton (United States of America)	580/600		
14	2002	August 18–25	(South Korea) Korea Rep.	Yong-In	Wan Yeong Jung (Republic of Korea)	510/600		
15	2003	August 16–23	United States	Kenosha, Wisconsin	Hwan-Seung Yeo (Republic of Korea)	455.4/600		
16	2004	September 11–18	Greece	Athens	Paul Jefferys (United Kingdom)	565/600		
17	2005	August 18–25	Poland	Nowy Sącz	Eric Price (United States of America), Weidong Hu (China), Yuan Zhou (China), Yuriy Znovyak (Ukraine)	600/600		
18	2006	August 13–20	Mexico	Mérida, Yucatán	Filip Wolski (Poland)	480/600		
19	2007	August 15–22	Croatia	Zagreb	Tomasz Kulczyński (Poland)	574/600		
20	2008	August 16–23	Egypt	Cairo	Huacheng Yu (China)	558/600		
21	2009	August 8–15	Bulgaria	Plovdiv	Gennady Korotkevich (Belarus)	743/800		
22	2010	August 14–21	Canada	Waterloo, Ontario	Gennady Korotkevich (Belarus)	778/800		
23	2011	July 22–29	Thailand	Pattaya	Gennady Korotkevich (Belarus)	600/600		
24	2012	September 23–30	Italy	Sirmione and Montichiari	Johnny Ho (United States of America)	600/600		
25	2013	July 6–13	Australia	Brisbane	Lijie Chen (China)	569/600		
26	2014	July 13–20	Taiwan	Taipei	Ishraq Huda (Australia), Scott Wu (United States of America), Yinzhan Xu (China)	600/600		
27	2015	July 26 – August 2	Kazakhstan	Almaty	Jeehak Yoon (Republic of Korea)	600/600		
28	2016	August 12–19	Russia	Kazan	Ce Jin (China)	597/600		
29	2017	July 28 – August 4	Iran	Tehran	Yuta Takaya (Japan)	589.52/600		
30	2018	September 1–8	Japan	Tsukuba	Benjamin Qi (United States of America)	499/600		
31	2019	August 4–11	Azerbaijan	Baku	Benjamin Qi (United States of America)	547.09/600		
32	2020	September 13–19^{a}	Singapore	online	William Lin (United States of America)	600/600		
33	2021	June 19–25	Singapore	online	Mingyang Deng (China)	600/600		
34	2022	August 7–15	Indonesia	Yogyakarta	Jiangqi Dai (China), Shaoxuan Tang (China)	600/600		
35	2023	August 28 – September 4	Hungary	Szeged	Tingqiang Xu (China)	580/600		
36	2024	September 1–8	Egypt	Alexandria	Kangyang Zhou (China)	600/600		
37	2025	July 27 – August 3	Bolivia	Sucre	Hengxi Liu (China)	591.23/600		
38	2026	August 9–16	Uzbekistan	Tashkent	Qiwen Xu (China)	498.27/600		
39	2027	September 12–19	Germany	Potsdam				
40	2028	September 3–9	Japan	Shibuya				
41	2029		Bulgaria					
42	2030		(Macau) Macao					

== All-time medal table ==
=== Top ===
As of 2026
Rank	Nation	Gold	Silver	Bronze	Total
1	China (CHN)	109	29	12	150
2	United States (USA)	71	43	17	131
3	Russia (RUS)	68	40	12	120
4	South Korea (KOR)	55	51	29	135
5	Poland (POL)	47	55	36	138
6	Japan (JPN)	40	34	11	85
7	Romania (ROU)	39	61	39	139
8	Iran (IRN)	33	71	26	130
9	Bulgaria (BGR)	30	58	47	135
10	Taiwan (TWN)	27	66	30	123
Totals (10 entries)		519	508	259	1,286

=== All ===
https://stats.ioinformatics.org/countries/

Since 1989 to 2026:

In almost every edition, the top 10% of participants receive gold, the next 20% receive silver, and the next 30% receive bronze.

International Olympiad in Informatics medal table
Rank	Nation	Gold	Silver	Bronze	Total
1	China (CHN)	109	29	12	150
2	United States (USA)	71	43	17	131
3	Russia (RUS)	68	40	12	120
4	South Korea (KOR)	55	51	29	135
5	Poland (POL)	47	55	36	138
6	Japan (JPN)	40	34	11	85
7	Romania (ROU)	39	61	39	139
8	Iran (IRN)	33	71	26	130
9	Bulgaria (BGR)	30	58	47	135
10	Taiwan (TWN)	27	66	30	123
11	Slovakia (SVK)	26	46	40	112
12	Vietnam (VNM)	23	55	55	133
13	Canada (CAN)	23	38	44	105
14	Singapore (SGP)	18	49	45	112
15	Croatia (HRV)	16	47	51	114
16	Belarus (BLR)	16	42	44	102
17	Hungary (HUN)	16	40	54	110
18	Czech Republic (CZE)	16	29	58	103
19	Thailand (THA)	15	40	68	123
20	Germany (DEU)	15	34	54	103
21	Ukraine (UKR)	14	44	52	110
22	Israel (ISR)	14	34	35	83
23	Sweden (SWE)	13	31	42	86
24	Australia (AUS)	12	35	42	89
25	Hong Kong (HKG)	9	38	51	98
26	Latvia (LVA)	8	25	57	90
27	Great Britain (GBR)	8	25	50	83
28	Georgia (GEO)	7	14	45	66
29	Estonia (EST)	6	20	43	69
30	Indonesia (IDN)	5	37	51	93
31	Turkey (TUR)	5	31	54	90
32	Finland (FIN)	5	29	48	82
33	Kazakhstan (KAZ)	4	33	42	79
34	Brazil (BRA)	4	21	43	68
35	Netherlands (NLD)	4	19	44	67
36	South Africa (ZAF)	4	13	49	66
37	Malaysia (MYS)	4	8	17	29
38	India (IND)	3	26	43	72
39	France (FRA)	3	21	44	68
40	Argentina (ARG)	3	9	28	40
41	Sri Lanka (LKA)	3	7	17	27
42	Austria (AUT)	3	6	30	39
43	Denmark (DNK)	3	6	24	33
44	Czechoslovakia (CSK)	3	4	2	9
45	Soviet Union (SUN)	3	4	1	8
46	Lithuania (LTU)	2	31	55	88
47	Italy (ITA)	2	27	45	74
48	Switzerland (CHE)	2	13	39	54
49	Serbia (SRB)	1	22	39	62
50	Spain (ESP)	1	9	23	33
51	Armenia (ARM)	1	8	37	46
52	Slovenia (SVN)	1	7	30	38
53	Bangladesh (BGD)	1	7	25	33
54	Ireland (IRL)	1	5	15	21
55	Philippines (PHL)	1	4	17	22
56	Mexico (MEX)	1	3	30	34
57	Norway (NOR)	1	3	11	15
58	Yugoslavia (YUG)	1	3	1	5
59	Mongolia (MNG)	1	2	11	14
60	Turkmenistan (TKM)	1	0	6	7
61	Moldova (MDA)	0	9	33	42
62	Cuba (CUB)	0	8	31	39
63	Egypt (EGY)	0	8	29	37
64	North Macedonia (MKD)	0	7	26	33
65	Macau (MAC)	0	7	21	28
66	Greece (GRC)	0	6	36	42
67	Kyrgyzstan (KGZ)	0	5	22	27
68	New Zealand (NZL)	0	3	26	29
69	Syria (SYR)	0	3	17	20
70	Belgium (BEL)	0	3	16	19
71	Cyprus (CYP)	0	3	12	15
72	Tajikistan (TJK)	0	3	7	10
73	Azerbaijan (AZE)	0	2	17	19
74	Colombia (COL)	0	2	11	13
75	Portugal (PRT)	0	2	9	11
76	Uzbekistan (UZB)	0	2	7	9
77	Luxembourg (LUX)	0	1	15	16
78	Bosnia and Herzegovina (BIH)	0	1	11	12
79	Saudi Arabia (SAU)	0	1	8	9
80	Jordan (JOR)	0	1	4	5
81	Morocco (MAR)	0	1	3	4
82	Pakistan (PAK)	0	0	7	7
83	Chile (CHL)	0	0	4	4
84	Iceland (ISL)	0	0	3	3
84	Trinidad and Tobago (TTO)	0	0	3	3
86	Malta (MLT)	0	0	2	2
86	Palestine (PSE)	0	0	2	2
86	Tunisia (TUN)	0	0	2	2
89	Algeria (DZA)	0	0	1	1
89	Montenegro (MNE)	0	0	1	1
89	Peru (PER)	0	0	1	1
89	Venezuela (VEN)	0	0	1	1
93	Albania (ALB)	0	0	0	0
93	Bolivia (BOL)	0	0	0	0
93	Costa Rica (CRI)	0	0	0	0
93	Dominican Republic (DOM)	0	0	0	0
93	Ecuador (ECU)	0	0	0	0
93	El Salvador (SLV)	0	0	0	0
93	Gabon (GAB)	0	0	0	0
93	Ghana (GHA)	0	0	0	0
93	Honduras (HND)	0	0	0	0
93	Kenya (KEN)	0	0	0	0
93	Kuwait (KUW)	0	0	0	0
93	Libya (LBY)	0	0	0	0
93	Madagascar (MDG)	0	0	0	0
93	Mauritius (MUS)	0	0	0	0
93	Mozambique (MOZ)	0	0	0	0
93	Nigeria (NGA)	0	0	0	0
93	Rwanda (RWA)	0	0	0	0
93	United Arab Emirates (ARE)	0	0	0	0
93	Zimbabwe (ZWE)	0	0	0	0
Totals (111 entries)		871	1,690	2,498	5,059

== Top Performances ==
The following is a list of the top performers in the history of the IOI, with the list containing any contestant with at least 3 gold medals. The ^{P} sign indicates a perfect score, a rare achievement in IOI history. The ^{U} sign indicates an unofficial participation, where a contestant participated in a host's second team. Also, first (I), second (II) and third (III) places among gold medalists are indicated where appropriate.

Name	Team	Years						
Gennady Korotkevich	Belarus	G(II) 2012	G^{P}(I) 2011	G(I) 2010	G(I) 2009	G 2008	G 2007	S 2006
Hristo Venev	Bulgaria	G 2016	G 2015	G 2014	G 2013	S 2012		
Rain Jiang	United States	G 2025	G 2024	G 2023	G 2021	S 2022		
Zixiang Zhou	Canada	G 2022	G 2021	G 2020	G(III) 2019	S 2018		
Filip Wolski	Poland	G(I) 2006	G 2005	G 2004	G 2003			
Rareș Darius Buhai	Romania	G 2015	G 2014	G 2013	G 2012			
Yuta Takaya	Japan	G(I) 2017	G 2016	G 2015	G 2014			
Rumen Hristov	Bulgaria	G 2012	G 2011	G(II) 2010	S 2009	S 2008		
Andrzej Gąsienica-Samek	Poland	G 1999	G 1998	G 1997	S 1996			
Eduard Batmendijn	Slovakia	G 2015	G 2013	G 2012	S 2014			
Martin Pettai	Estonia	G 2002	G 2001	G 2000	S 1999			
Nikoloz Birkadze	Georgia	G 2020	G 2019	G 2018	S 2017			
Patrick Pavić	Croatia	G 2022	G 2021	G 2020	S 2019			
Ryan Bai	Canada	G 2025	G 2024	G 2023	S 2022			
Daiki Kodama	Japan	G 2023	G 2022	G 2021				
Daniel Weber	Israel	G 2024	G 2023	G 2022				
Jarosław Kwiecień	Poland	G 2016	G 2015	G 2014				
John Pardon	United States	G 2007	G 2006	G 2005				
Marcin Andrychowicz	Poland	G 2008	G 2007	G 2006				
Martin Mareš	Czech Republic	G 1995	G 1994	G^{P}(I) 1993				
Masataka Yoneda	Japan	G 2020	G 2019	G^{U} 2018				
Neal Wu	United States	G 2010	G 2009	G 2008				
Scott Wu	United States	G^{P}(I) 2014	G 2013	G 2012				
Shogo Murai	Japan	G 2012	G 2011	G 2010				
Vladimir Martianov	Russia	G 1999	G^{P}(I) 1998	G(I) 1997				
Vladimir Romanov	Russia	G 2019	G 2018	G 2017				

== Feeder competitions ==
Most participating countries use feeder competitions to select their team. They are usually referred to as National Olympiad in Informatics and is the course of selection of the country's top team or persons to participate in the IOI. A number of these are listed below:

- Australian Informatics Olympiad
- British Informatics Olympiad
- Canadian Computing Olympiad

- The participants of which are chosen from the Canadian Computing Competition

- Central European Olympiad in Informatics
- Indian Computing Olympiad
- National Olympiad in Informatics, China
- Olimpiada Națională de Informatică
- Nederlandse Informatica Olympiade
- Olimpiada Mexicana de Informática
- South African Computer Olympiad
- Syrian Olympiad in Informatics
- United States of America Computing Olympiad
- Moroccan Olympiad in Informatics
- All Ireland Programming Olympiad
- Indonesian Olympiad in Informatics
- Egyptian Olympiad in Informatics
- National Olympiad in Informatics - Philippines
- Bundeswettbewerb Informatik - Germany
- Vietnamese Olympiad in Informatics
- Thailand Olympiad in Informatics (TOI)

== Notes ==
1.^aIOI 2020 virtual closing ceremony was held on September 23, 2020.

== See also ==
- List of computer science awards
- International Science Olympiad
- International Collegiate Programming Contest
- Central European Olympiad in Informatics
- Competitive programming
- International Mathematical Olympiad
- Capture the flag (cybersecurity)
