= Corpus Christi College =

Corpus Christi College may refer to the following colleges:

== Australia ==
- Corpus Christi College Maroubra, New South Wales
- Corpus Christi College, Melbourne, Victoria
- Corpus Christi College, Perth, Western Australia

== Canada ==
- Corpus Christi College (Vancouver), Vancouver, Canada

== Nigeria ==
- Corpus Christi College (Enugu State), in Achi, Enugu State, Nigeria
- Corpus Christi College (Ekiti State), in Ilawe Ekiti, Ekiti State, Nigeria

== United Kingdom ==
- Corpus Christi College, Belfast, a former school in Belfast, Northern Ireland
- Corpus Christi College, Cambridge, a constituent college within Cambridge University
- Corpus Christi College, Oxford, a constituent college within Oxford University

== See also ==
- Corpus Christi Catholic College, a comprehensive school in Leeds, England
- Corpus Christi School (disambiguation)
