= Citizen Cyberscience Centre =

The Citizen Cyberscience Centre (CCC) is an organization for volunteer computing formed as a partnership between CERN, UNITAR, and the University of Geneva.

In August 2011, a new version of the BOINC-based volunteer computing project LHC@home began simulating the high-energy collisions of protons in CERN's Large Hadron Collider (LHC), with CCC's help.

The Citizen Cyberscience Centre is currently hosted at the UNITAR offices at CERN.
