= Puerto National High School =

Public high school in Cagayan de Oro, Philippines

Puerto National High School Mataas na Paaralang ng Puerto (Filipino)

Location
- Cagayan de Oro, Misamis Oriental; Philippines
- Coordinates: 8°30′00″N 124°44′54″E

Information
- Former names: Agusan National High School-Puerto annex(2005-2008)
- Type: Public, High School
- Established: 2005
- Campus: P-3 Balok-Balok Puerto (Main campus)
- Color(s): Sky Blue & Blue
- Nickname: The Gateway

Puerto National High School-(PNHS) is a public secondary school of Cagayan de Oro and was founded in 2005 basically an annex school building of Agusan.
