= California Coast Classic Bike Tour =

Annual scenic bike ride

California Coast Classic Bike Tour (CCC) is an annual scenic bike ride, held annually since 2000 in the U.S. state of California. It is held over eight days and covers 525 miles along the coast on California State Route 1. The Tour starts at Fisherman's Wharf, San Francisco and ends on the strand of Los Angeles. The CCC is limited to 250 riders to raise funds annually for the Arthritis Foundation. The self-paced pedaling travel is open to cyclists of all levels including e-bike riders.
