= Cryogenic current comparator =

The cryogenic current comparator (CCC) is used in the electrical precision measurements to compare electric currents with the highest accuracy. This device exceeds the accuracy of other current comparators around several orders of magnitude. It is used in electrical metrology for exact comparative measurements of electric resistances or the amplification and measurement of extremely small electric currents.

The CCC principle goes back on Harvey and is based substantially on the properties of superconductors. CCCs make use of macroscopic quantum effects that occur in superconducting materials or circuits underneath their critical temperature of typically a few kelvins. The term "Cryogenic Current Comparator" stems from κρυος (Gr. frost, ice) and comparare (Lat. compare). The two quantum effects used in a CCC are the ideal diamagnetism of the superconductor, caused by the Meissner effect, and the macroscopic quantum interference of currents in a superconducting quantum sensor.

For the comparison of two currents, these are fed through two wires which are led through a superconducting tube. The Meissner effect induces a screening current on the inner surface of the tube, flowing opposite to and being exactly as large as the sum of the currents inside the tube. Thus, this shielding current exactly cancels the magnetic field inside the tube produced by the currents in the wires. The screening current flows back across the outer surface of the tube, giving rise to a magnetic field in the room outside of the tube. This field is detected by a highly sensitive magnetometer, acting as a null detector. The signal of this null detector thus is a measure for the equality of the currents; in particular, it is zero if the two currents are of exactly equal magnitude. The important and crucial point characterizing the CCC is the fact that the magnitude of the screening current and its distribution on the surface of the superconducting screen is independent of the position and the path of the wires inside the tube.

Typical for a CCC is the use of a SQUID magnetometer as null detector for the magnetic field (SQUID = Superconducting Quantum Interference Device). These are capable of detecting extremely small changes of the magnetic field corresponding to fractions of the magnetic flux quantum = h/2e ≈ 2×10^{−15} V·s (h is the Planck constant and e the elementary charge). The function principle of a SQUID is based on macroscopic quantum interferences of electric currents, arising in superconducting circuits (loops) with tunnel junctions.

Resistance bridges based on CCCs are used for the comparison of electrical resistances, in particular, if highest-precision measurements are required, as there is the traceability of the resistance unit to the quantum Hall effect (QHE). In this way, measurements connecting standard resistors ranging from 1 ohm up to 10 kΩ to a QHE resistor of 12.9 kΩ are performed at several national institutes of metrology as, for instance, the National Institute of Standards and Technology (NIST, USA) or the Physikalisch-Technische Bundesanstalt (PTB, D). Here, electrical resistance comparisons using CCCs are accomplished with relative measurement uncertainties of only about 10^{−9}.
