= Comics Campaign Council =

The Comics Campaign Council was a British pressure group formed in 1953 in response to growing concern about the effects of imported American horror comics such as The Vault of Horror and The Haunt of Fear on British youths. At the time, the comics industry was largely unregulated, a situation that the Comics Campaign Council sought to rectify. Prior to the formation of the CCC, the majority of political campaigning on the issue had been by front organisations of the Communist Party of Great Britain, who objected to the "thoroughly pernicious influence" of "American-style [...] that wallow in crime, horror, violence and sex". Such concerns were largely dismissed by the government; a memorandum issued by the Home Secretary, Gwilym Lloyd George described the overall effect of such comics as being "a matter of opinion rather than of fact".

The CCC served to unify the disparate protest groups, gathering support among professionals such as doctors and teachers, issuing pamphlets, holding public meetings and submitting opinion pieces to various national news outlets. The campaign intensified in late 1954 and within a year, the resulting moral panic among the British populace reached a level not seen since the backlash against penny dreadfuls in the 19th century. Despite having ruled in 1952 that no legislation of such works was required, the changing tide of public opinion led the government to push through the Children and Young Persons (Harmful Publications) Act 1955. The Act banned the printing or sale of any publication which "consists wholly or mainly of stories told in pictures" that portrayed "(a) the commission of crimes; or (b) acts of violence or cruelty; or (c) incidents of a repulsive or horrible nature; in such a way that the work as a whole would tend to corrupt a child or young person into whose hands it might fall". Following the passing of the Act into law, the Council concerned itself mostly with "outing" specific comics as examples of morally corrupting work and pushing for prosecution of the publishers. While many such cases were referred to the Director of Public Prosecutions, the first actual prosecution under the terms of the Act did not take place until 1970.

Martin Barker's 1984 book A Haunt of Fears is principally concerned with a critical account of the CCC. In it he examines the early campaigns of the Communist Party at the time, and its concerns with British cultural values, cultural imperialism and a McCarthyism it perceived as intrinsic to popular American culture, the involvement of the NUT which would come to overshadow the efforts of the CP, the subject as it appeared in news and the perception of other cultural events like the emergence of the Teds in British society, and an examination of exemplary samples of horror comics like The Orphan (or Lucy's Tale, as Barker refers to it). Barker's conclusion is to cast the perception of comics as a form of moral panic, in part attributed to the real impact of the Second World War, comparing their reception to controversial literary examples like Golding's Lord of the Flies, and attribute to them a political character opposite to the conservative anti-Communism which the British left identified in US commercial culture.

== See also ==
- Comics Code Authority
