= Community Christian College =

College in Quartzsite, AZ

- Type: Private junior college
- Location: Quartzsite, Arizona, United States
- Website: cccollege.edu

Community Christian College (CCC) is a private Christian junior college in Quartzsite, Arizona, United States.

== Accreditation ==
Since 2005, Community Christian College has been accredited by the Transnational Association of Christian Colleges and Schools.
