= Central European Olympiad in Informatics =

The Central European Olympiad in Informatics (CEOI) is an annual informatics competition for secondary school students. Each of the participating central European countries (plus one or two guest countries, and a local team from the host area) sends a team of up to four contestants, a team leader and a deputy team leader. The contestants compete individually, i.e. a team score is not calculated. Competitors are selected through national competitive programming contests.

The contest consists of two days computer programming, solving problems of an algorithmic nature. The structure of these competition days is described in the article about the International Olympiad in Informatics (IOI), which served as a role model for the more local CEOI.

The first CEOI was held in 1994 in Romania (founder of the CEOI), five years after the first IOI.

== List of CEOI ==
- CEOI 1994 was held in Cluj-Napoca, Romania (27–31 May 1994). Participants: Croatia, Czech Republic, Hungary, Moldova, Poland, Romania, Turkey, Yugoslavia
- CEOI 1995 was held in Szeged, Hungary (29 May – 3 June 1995). Participants: Belarus, Croatia, Czech Republic, Estonia, Hungary, Lithuania, Poland, Romania, Slovakia, Ukraine, Yugoslavia
- CEOI 1996 was held in Bratislava, Slovakia (9–13 October 1996). Participants: Croatia, Czech Republic, Hungary, Poland, Romania, Slovakia, Slovenia
- CEOI 1997 was held in Nowy Sącz, Poland (17–24 July 1997). Participants: Belarus, Croatia, Estonia, Germany, Hungary, Latvia, Lithuania, Netherlands, Poland, Romania, Slovakia, Ukraine, United States, Yugoslavia
- CEOI 1998 was held in Zadar, Croatia (20–27 May 1998). Participants: Bosnia and Herzegovina, Croatia, Czech Republic, Germany, Hungary, Poland, Romania, Slovakia, Slovenia
- CEOI 1999 was held in Brno, Czech Republic (2–9 September 1999). Participants: Bosnia and Herzegovina, Croatia, Czech Republic, Germany, Hungary, Poland, Romania, Slovakia, Slovenia, United States
- CEOI 2000 was held in Cluj-Napoca, Romania (24–31 August 2000). Participants: Croatia, Czech Republic, Germany, Hungary, Moldova, Netherlands, Poland, Romania, Slovakia, Slovenia, United States
- CEOI 2001 was held in Zalaegerszeg, Hungary (10–17 August 2001). Participants: Austria, Croatia, Czech Republic, Germany, Hungary, Poland, Romania, Slovakia, Slovenia, Estonia, Finland, Italy, Netherlands
- CEOI 2002 was held in Košice, Slovakia (30 June – 6 July 2002). Participants: Austria, Croatia, Czech Republic, Germany, Hungary, Poland, Romania, Slovakia, Slovenia, Netherlands, Iran
- CEOI 2003 was held in Münster, Germany (5–12 July 2003). Participants: Croatia, Poland, Czech Republic, Slovenia, Netherlands, United States, Hungary, Slovakia, Romania, Iran, Germany, Westphalia
- CEOI 2004 was held in Rzeszów, Poland (13 July – 17 July 2004). Participants: Bosnia and Herzegovina, Croatia, Czech Republic, Germany, Hungary, Poland, Romania, Slovakia
- CEOI 2005 was held in Sárospatak, Hungary (28 July – 5 August, 2005). Participants: Bosnia and Herzegovina, Croatia, Czech Republic, Estonia, France, Germany, Hungary, Poland, Romania, Sárospatak, Slovakia, Spain, Netherlands.
- CEOI 2006 was held in Vrsar, Croatia (1–8 July 2006). Participants: Croatia, Czech Republic, Germany, Hungary, Poland, Romania, Slovakia, Croatia II, Croatia III.
- CEOI 2007 was held in Brno, Czech Republic (1–7 July 2007). Participants: Croatia, Czech Republic, Germany, Hungary, Poland, Romania, Slovakia, Czech Republic II, Brno.
- CEOI 2008 was held in Dresden, Germany (6–12 July 2008). Participants: Croatia, Czech Republic, Germany, Hungary, Israel, Poland, Romania, Saxony, Slovakia.
- CEOI 2009 was held in Târgu Mureş, Romania (8–14 July 2009). Participants: Croatia, Czech Republic, Germany, Hungary, Poland, Romania, Slovakia, Switzerland, United States, Serbia, Moldova.
- CEOI 2010 was held in Košice, Slovakia (12–19 July 2010). Participants: Bulgaria, Croatia, Czech Republic, Germany, Hungary, Poland, Romania, Slovakia, and Switzerland.
- CEOI 2011 was held in Gdynia, Poland (7–12 July 2011). Participants: Bulgaria, Croatia, Czech Republic, Germany, Hungary, Poland, Romania, Slovakia, Slovenia and Switzerland.
- CEOI 2012 was held in Tata, Hungary (7–13 July 2012). Participants: Bulgaria, Croatia, Czech Republic, Germany, Hungary, Poland, Romania, Israel, Switzerland, Netherlands, Slovakia and Slovenia.
- CEOI 2013 was held in Primošten, Croatia (13–19 October 2013). Participants: Croatia, Czech republic, Germany, Hungary, Poland, Romania, Switzerland, Slovakia and Slovenia.
- CEOI 2014 was held in Jena, Germany (18–24 June 2014).
- CEOI 2015 was held in Brno, Czech Republic (29 June – 4 July 2015). Participants: Croatia, Czech Republic, Georgia, Germany, Hungary, Poland, Romania, Slovakia, Slovenia, Switzerland.
- CEOI 2016 was held in Piatra Neamț, Romania (18–23 July 2016). Participants: Bulgaria, Croatia, Czech Republic, Georgia, Germany, Hungary, Moldova, Poland, Romania, Slovakia, Slovenia, Switzerland.
- CEOI 2017 was held in Ljubljana, Slovenia (10–15 July 2017).
- CEOI 2018 was held in Warsaw, Poland (12–18 August 2018).
- CEOI 2019 was held in Bratislava, Slovakia (23–29 July 2019).
- CEOI 2020 was held in Nagykanizsa, Hungary (23–29 August 2020).
- CEOI 2021 was supposed to be held in Zagreb, Croatia, was held online instead (1–5 September 2021).
- CEOI 2022 was held in Varaždin, Croatia (24–30 July 2022).
- CEOI 2023 was held in Magdeburg, Germany (13–19 August 2023).
- CEOI 2024 was held in Brno, Czech Republic (23–29 June 2024).
- CEOI 2025 was held in Cluj-Napoca, Romania (7–13 July 2025).

== See also ==
- International Science Olympiads
- International Olympiad in Informatics
- USA Computing Olympiad
