= Ventilator 202 =

Yugoslavian live radio show

Ventilator 202 (in Serbian, meaning: 'electric fan 202') was a live radio show broadcast by Radio Beograd 202 during the 1980s and hosted by Zoran Modli. It was one of the most important shows of that station and possibly also the most important project of its host. It first aired first June 3, 1979. Zoran Modli was its host until late 1987. He later hosted another similar show, Modulacije. Ventilator 202 was then renamed to 501 and hosted by Dubravka Marković, giving it her own style. It was notable for its promotion of local (domestic) demo music, early application of computers and introduction of "absolute radio" concept.

Ventilator 202 was a show done differently from other contemporary radio shows in Yugoslavia. Zoran Modli was not only the show's host but also operated the mixing console and other equipment himself. Essentially he was also a disc jockey.

During the second half of the 1980s, Ventilator 202 broadcast computer software recorded on cassette tapes for popular home computers Galaksija, ZX Spectrum and Commodore 64.

== Demo music ==
A number of other contemporary radio shows broadcast demo music made by young bands but failed to gain popularity. Zoran Modli took a different approach with Ventilator 202. Instead of playing solely demo music he interleaved it with hits of the time, as equal. The show gained such popularity that it became a great starting point for young musicians and a way to hear an alternative to established sound. Ventilator 202 had no shortage of demo tapes coming in, from the entire Yugoslavia of the time.

The popularity eventually lead to the idea that actual albums (vinyl records and cassette tapes) can be released with the best of the best. With the help of Dušan Pančić, Ventilator 202 released the first Demo Top 10 album in April 1983, soon to be followed by a second one in November 1983. The last, third, album created by the original team was released Spring 1985.

=== Volume 1 - April 1983 ===
- Rex Ilusivii: "Zla kob"
- Šta se vidi kroz durbin: "Želi da ga zaboravi"
- Partibrejkers: "Radio utopija"
- Berliner Strasse: "Maske"
- Miško Plavi: "Hemija"
- Petar i Zli vuci: "Moroni"
- 39. legija: "Smisao"
- Zak: "Kosmička balada"
- Laki Pingvini: "Možda, možda"
- Via Talas: "Ti"

=== Volume 2 - November 1983 ===
- Ajfel na kraju: "Mahatma"
- Atlantski poremećaj: "Ništa se ne dogadja"
- Tadaima: "Poželih"
- Belo belo: "Ružičasta bluza"
- Aja Sofija: "Poslednji mangup sa Dorćola"
- Aja Sofija: "Uvek si tu"
- Amerika snova: "Andaluzija"
- Vatrostalno staklo: "Ovih dana nije smela"
- Vanila pakt: "Andaluzija"
- Gustaph i njegovi dobri duhovi: "Upotreba majmuna"

=== Volume 3 - Spring 1985 ===
- Rex Ilusivii: "Arabia"
- Fleke: "Slatka mala"
- Karlowy Vary: "Ratnici"
- Sayonara: "Neka draga lica"
- La Strada: "Želje"
- Ursula i provincijalac: "Budilnik za Radmilu P."
- Belo belo: "Tamni vilajet"
- Psihomodo Pop: "Zauvijek"
- Oskarova fobija: "Beli dekolte"
- Solunski front: "Ratnom drugu čast"
- Mrgudi: "Proleteri"

== Broadcasting computer software ==
The show went as far as broadcasting software for computers of the day, such as Galaksija, ZX Spectrum and Commodore 64. The host would announce the details of the software about to be broadcast (title, type of computer, etc.). Ready listeners would then engage their tape recorders and record the characteristic noise that would have turned unsuspecting listeners away.

This initiative became so popular that special software was made specifically for the show, such as the flight simulator and "Velika Akcija" (Great Action) games and an early electronic journal. The journal was broadcast as the entire program used to view it.

Ventilator 202 also featured computer professionals and publicists talking about various interesting subjects. Frequent speakers were Vladimir Ajdačić, Miša Milosavljević, Gavrilo Vučković, Jovan Regasek, Tansije Gavranović, Zoran Živković, Aca Milinković and Dejan Ristanović.

== Staff ==
- Zoran Modli, host and DJ
- Dušan Pančić
- Vladimir Ajdačić
- Miša Milosavljević
- Voja Antonić
- Dejan Ristanović

== See also ==
- Ventilator 202 - article written by Zoran Modli, the show's host. In Serbian.
- Nicest demo recordings from "Ventilator 202" - a collection of MP3 and RealAudio samples of demo songs broadcast by Ventilator 202, maintained by Zoran Modli, the show's host. In Serbian.
- Games published by Ventilator 202 - a list of games developed and broadcast by Ventilator 202 team.
- Ventilator 202, Blic, October 16, 2008
