= Galaksija =

Galaksija is Serbian, Croatian, Bosnian, Slovenian, and Montenegrin word for galaxy. It may refer to:

- Galaksija (magazine), a magazine published since 1972 to 1990s
- Galaksija (computer), a 1983 home computer
