= Modulacije =

Defunct Serbian radio show

Modulacije (pronounced modulatsiye, eng. modulations) was a Serbian live radio show. It first aired on Radio Pingvin May 1, 1993 and continued until December 24, 1999 on a number of different radio stations including Radio Beograd 202 and MIP Radio.

It was a natural continuation of Ventilator 202 show of the same author, host and DJ, Zoran Modli. The show covered "computers and technological communications", also subjects of Studio B Radio Computer Show previously hosted by Zoran Modli and Marko Janković together. Like Ventilator 202, the show aired a lot of good music.

== New Top 10 ==
Just as Ventilator 202 was inventive in the 1980s in the subject matter and style by successfully bringing demo music and broadcast computer software, Modulacije continued the similar success in the 1990s. "Demo Top 10" of Ventilator 202 was replaced by the works of emerging module file artists and created the first "Module Top 10", broadcast directly from Mr Modli's notebook computer.

== First air playout system ==
From the very beginning it became apparent that computers can do much more for the show and radio station than play module files. This led to speedy creation of air playout and music scheduling system using contemporary PCs named SoftSound.

It was developed in-house (Radio Pingvin) and was used to play jingles, commercials and music instantly, at a click of a single button, which increased the dynamics of the show. This was the first such system employed in Yugoslavia at the time on any radio or TV station.

However, it did not take long before many competing products have been developed and deployed. When Modulacije show moved to Beograd 202 radio station the team had to switch to its HD Player system, for example.

== Radio stations ==
Modulacije started May 1st, 1993 on Radio Pingvin. After the owner of Radio Pingvin was murdered and the stylistic direction of the radio station changed, many of the teams left.

On April 22, 1995 Modulacije show aired on Beograd 202, the original station of Zoran Modli's Ventilator 202. During this period the show earned the Diskobolos award from the Computer Science Federation of Yugoslavia as the best computer-related radio/TV show.

January 1998 Modulacije came back to Radio Pingvin after it changed a number of owners and, at the time, belonging to RTV Pink. The suffix "The Next Generation" was added to the name of the show.

During the same year (1998) the entire Modulacije team also co-hosted or otherwise participated in the Polarotor TV Show of RTS 3K TV station, giving the same audience more of the same content.

Broadcasting of show was suspended during NATO bombing of Yugoslavia until July 16, 1999 when it continued on MIP Radio until December 24 of the same year.

== Staff ==
Modulacije show brought together many friends and colleagues of Zoran Modli, its host. Many of them made regular appearances to cover their specific subject areas, contributing to the show's incredible diversity.

- Host: Zoran Modli
- Music selection & host of the "Rock Time Travel": Boban Obradović
- Various assistants: Aca Milošević, Vlada Bubanja, Dušan Vidović, Mališa Manić, Voja Antonić, dr Dragan Ćosić, Čeda Bradić, Žarko Gojković, Jelena Jan, Marijana Anastasijević, Vesna Ćosić, Branko Pekić, dr Dragan Ćosić, Aleksandar Šušnjar, Ivan Ivković, Branko Đaković, Sandra Mitrović, Nenad Mijatović, Momir Radić, Petar Kočović, Zoran Stanojević, Dejan Ristanović, Voja Gašić, Emin Smajić, Dragan Tanaskoski, Olga Milanko, Ružica Radović, Aca Radovanović, Relja Jović, Srđan Paunović, Vukašin Mitrović, Ratko Stefanović, Dejan V. Veselinović, Duško Savić, Željko Đurić, Dubravka Đurić, Marin Mihaić, Bane Miljković, Dragutin Gaga Marković, Boris Daljević, Milenko Vasić, Zoran Životić, Dragan Kukić, Violeta Ivković, Zoran Mošorinski, Nenad Veljković, Branislav Bubanja, Radivoje Grbović, Đorđe Dukić, Rade Santrač, Gordan Brkić, Peđa Dimić, Adis Ajalev, Aleksandar Spasić, Ljiljana Maksimović, Vladimir Petrović, Danil Maljoković, Vladimir Anić, Zoran Rađen, etc.
