= Milan Raspopović =

Serbian mathematician

- Милан Распоповић

3rd director of Mathematical Gymnasium Belgrade
- In office 1970–2001
- Preceded by: Dušan Adnađević, DSc mathematics, Faculty of Natural Sciences and Mathematics, University of Belgrade
- Succeeded by: Ljubomir Protić, DSc mathematics, Faculty of Mathematics, University of Belgrade

Personal details
- Born: 6 July 1936 (age 90) Martinići, Danilovgrad, Kingdom of Yugoslavia
- Education: University of Belgrade

Milan Raspopović (Serbian Cyrillic: Милан Распоповић) was a member of the commission for the establishment of Belgrade Mathematical Gymnasium (abbr. MG) in 1963. He was the first MG physics professor from 1966, and the creator of the MG Physics Curriculum. Milan Raspopović was an MG professor of electronics, and MG principal and director, elected to office in 1970. He served in parallel as both the principal and the director of the Mathematical Gymnasium Belgrade for 32 years until his retirement in 2002.

== Education ==
Milan Raspopović received his PhD in physics and philosophy from the University of Belgrade. He successfully defended his PhD thesis titled "The impact of Ludwig Boltzmann’s teachings and understandings on physics and philosophy" at the Faculty of Electrical Engineering, University of Belgrade.

== Career ==
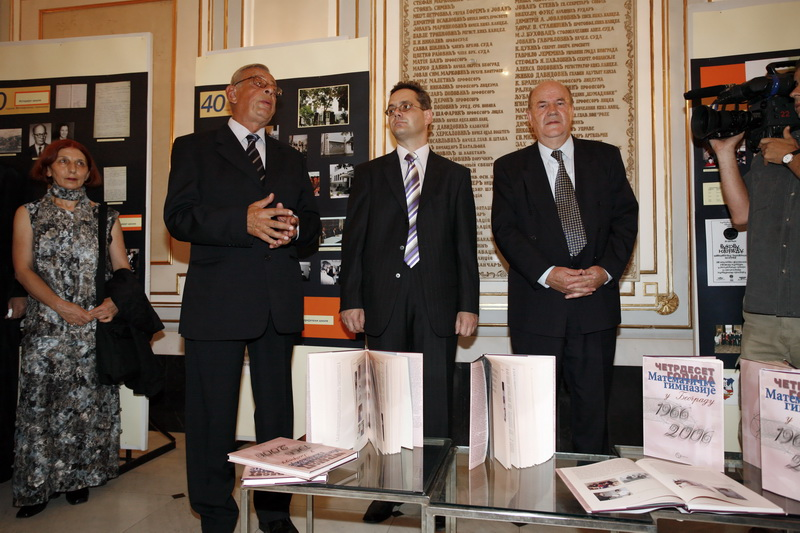
Principals of Mathematical Gymnasium Belgrade (MGB): mathematician Ljubomir Protić (2002–2004), mathematician Vladimir Dragović (2004–2008), and physicist Milan Raspopović (1970–2001). All three were university professors.

Raspopović was the first professor of Physics at the Mathematical Gymnasium of Belgrade, a specialized institution for math and physics, and the creator of the school's physics and overall curriculum. Raspopović taught university-level courses at the University of Belgrade, the University of Niš, the University of Kragujevac, and the University of Montenegro. During that time, he was principal and director at Mathematical Gymnasium Belgrade. Raspopović and Emilo Danilović, then Serbian Chief Scientific Advisor for physics, created the first MG curriculum in physics.

=== Textbooks ===
Raspopović has authored or co-authored over 30 physics textbooks and assignment collections for elementary and secondary schools. His work primarily focuses on physics textbooks for elementary and high schools, along with assignment collections for technical (engineering) and general science high schools.

Professor Raspopović's books have the highest circulation across Serbia, Montenegro, and the former Yugoslavia. Raspopović also co-authored textbooks and collections of solved problems with professors from the Mathematical Gymnasium.

== Awards ==
Raspopovic was awarded the Sretenje Order (3rd class) in February 2015, "for special merits for the Republic of Serbia and its citizens in educational and pedagogical activities".

== International results ==
Raspopović led the school as its principal and director for 32 years. The school held records for winning more than 400 medals at international competitions and for graduating scientists with approximately 2000 PhDs among its alumni. Sometimes, all of the medals at Republics or Federal competitions in Serbia and Socialist Federative Republic of Yugoslavia, in all categories and for every single grade, were won by students of Mathematical Gymnasium Belgrade. Yugoslavian teams for International Olympiads consisted mostly or only students from Mathematical Gymnasium Belgrade.

In 1974, 7 out of 8 members of Yugoslavia's national team for the International Mathematical Olympiad (IMO) were from Mathematical Gymnasium Belgrade. It caused political comment since Yugoslavia had six Republics and seven out of eight students for IMO came from Belgrade's Mathematical Gymnasium. The Yugoslav team came back from the IMO with five medals: two gold, one silver, and two bronze. Yugoslavia ranked 5th in the world, and USSR and Yugoslavia were the only 2 countries that won two gold medals that year. In 2010, the Serbian national team for IMO had MG students only. They ranked 10th in the world as a country (Serbia) and took first place in the world as a school.

== Retirement ==
Raspopović was a professor in Mathematical Gymnasium Belgrade from the school's foundation days in 1966 and was elected Principal and Director in 1970. He served as Principal and Director until his retirement, effective from 2002. He was succeeded as a Principal by Ljubomir Protić of the Faculty of Mathematics, University of Belgrade. Milan Raspopović remained an active member of the Mathematical Gymnasium Trust and Mathematical Gymnasium Scientific Board.
