= Violeta Ivković =

Serbian journalist and writer

- Born: 1957 (age 68–69); Belgrade, Serbia
- Education: University of Oxford
- Occupations: Serbian journalist, writer
- Children: 3

Violeta Ivković (Serbian-Cyrillic: Виолета Ивковић; born 1957 in Belgrade) is a Serbian journalist and writer.

== Biography ==
Violeta Ivković studied at the Faculty of English Language and Literature at the University of Oxford and is the mother of three children. After completing her studies, she pursued a career in journalism with a focus on information and communications technologies. She wrote articles for magazines such as Mikro PC World, SciTech and Com&GSM, and is the author of contributions to Zoran Modli’s radio shows Modulacije and Zair. Although she is retired, she continues lecturing at the annual Workshop for Creative Writing (Radionica za kreativnog pisanja „PričArt”) initiated by Zoran Zivković and first held in 2011.

Her first work Friends is an email diary set in the period March to June 1999 during the NATO bombing of Yugoslavia and its prologue states: Its format is an electronic diary that deals with thoughts, fears, feelings, events that cannot be shared even with those closest to us, for many understandable reasons. Her most recent novel The Blogger talks about the teenager Anna, who writes a blog expressing her feelings, desires and dreams. Anna lives with her mother and sister. Her parents are divorced, but Dad visits them often. The teen misses the time when they all still lived together. An English version of Friends was published by herself on Scribd and an English excerpt from the novel The Island is available on the website of the magazine Words Without Borders. A Serbian selection of her articles of the magazine Mikro PC World can be read online on the website of Zoran Modli. Ivković's latest book The Blogger is her most successful book to date with two editions.

== Awards ==
Ivković is laureate of the Mali Nemo Award 2009 for her novel Dining Room.

== Works ==
- Moji su drugovi (Friends), self-publication, Todra printing, Belgrade 1999.
- Život u ljubičastom: internet priče (Life in Purple: stories from the internet), self-publication, Todra, Belgrade 2001.
- Trpezarija (Dining Room), Mali Nemo, Pančevo 2009, ISBN 978-86-7972-044-3.
- Ogrizak noći (The Scrap of the Night), Udruženje građanja Čekić, Belgrade 2010, ISBN 978-86-88463-04-1.
- Ostrvo (The Island), Polaris, Belgrade 2013, ISBN 978-86-83741-34-2.
- Blogerka (The Blogger), Klett, Belgrade 2018, ISBN 978-86-533-0016-6.
- Beton (Concrete), Psychological thriller, Makart, Belgrade 2019, ISBN 978-86-87115-19-4.
