= Vladislav Radak =

Vladislav Radak (born on December 25, 1987) is a Serbian mathematician, writer, television host, and short film director.

== Biography ==
Radak was born in Belgrade, where he completed the "Vuk Karadžić" Elementary School, the Belgrade Mathematical Gymnasium, and subsequently graduated in mathematics at the University of Belgrade, specializing in Statistics, Actuarial, and Financial Mathematics. He defended his master's thesis, titled "Dynamic Signaling Model and Its Application in Higher Education," in 2013. Additionally, he completed lower music school at the "Dr. Vojislav Vučković" music school, majoring in accordion, with the piano as his second instrument.

At the age of fifteen, he wrote his first novel, The Blue Notebook (in Serbian Plava vežbanka), which was published by the "Interpress" publishing house in 2005 upon the recommendation of children's author Slobodan Stanišić. That same year, he began working at Radio Television of Serbia (RTS) alongside a group of his peers as an author and host of the youth television show The Staircase (in Serbian Stepenište). More than 60 episodes of the series were filmed.

In the summer of 2005, Radak directed the short film Imagine, which was nominated for best film in the "OneMinute" category at the Amsterdam Film Festival in October of that year. In the spring of 2006, he completed his second short film, Blue Lorry, which won "The Golden Starfish" award for best young director at the Hamptons Film Festival in New York in 2007.

Radak published his second novel, Night of Dead Dreams (in Serbian Noć mrtvih snova), in 2009 through the "Dobra knjiga" publishing house. The book was presented at the Students' Cultural Center (SKC) in July 2009. An English translation of the novel by Sonja Nikčević was published in 2015. A second edition of Night of Dead Dreams was released in October 2025 by the "Sumatra" publishing house.

Radak is the co-author of the book The Formula of Life - For Everyone Who Loves Mathematics and Wants to Gift it to Others (in Srbian Formula života - za sve koji vole matematiku i žele da je poklone drugima), published by Matematiskop in 2011. The book focuses on presenting the Singapore model of mathematics.

He has been a member of the OECD/PISA team for the evaluation of student achievement since 2009.

On October 19, 2013, at the third TEDxNoviSad conference, he delivered a lecture titled "Mathematics is Not a Bogeyman, It Just Has Bad PR."

His third novel, The Book (in Serbian Knjiga), was published in 2015. A second edition of The Book was published in 2019 by Portalibris.

Radak has been a member of the Writers' Association of Germany since 2018, with several translated selections of his work appearing in the organization's annual anthologies. He completed his PhD at the Technical University of Dortmund in 2021, specializing in the application of game theory to finance. During his studies, he also taught financial mathematics at the university from 2015 to 2019. Since 2021, Radak has taught financial mathematics at an international university in Düsseldorf and has served as an assistant professor for the Master of Computational Finance program at the School of Computing in Belgrade.

He lives and works in Germany.
