= Srđan Ognjanović =

Serbian mathematician

Srđan Ognjanović Срђан Огњановић
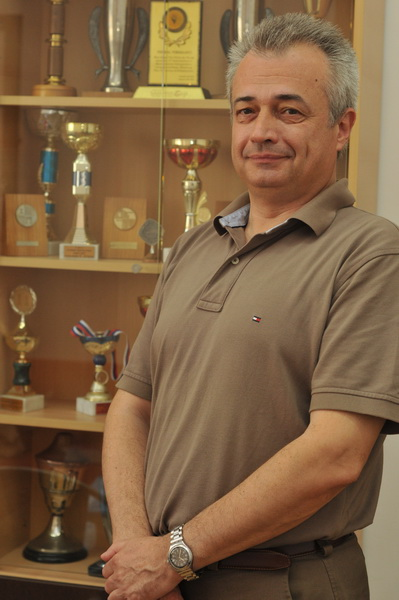
- Incumbent
- Assumed office 2008
- Preceded by: Vladimir Dragović, dr sci in mathematics, Faculty of Mathematics of University of Belgrade, and Faculty of Mechanics and Mathematics, Department for Higher Geometry and Topology, Moscow State University

Personal details
- Education: University of Belgrade

Srđan Ognjanović (Serbian Cyrillic: Срђан Огњановић, English alternatives: Srdjan Ognjanovic, and Srdan Ognjanovic) is a Serbian mathematician. He was a principal of Mathematical Grammar School in Belgrade.

== Career ==
He received his degrees in the field of Mathematical Sciences from the Faculty of Mathematics and Natural Sciences, University of Belgrade. Prior to that, Ognjanović was a student of Mathematical Gymnasium Belgrade, from which he graduated in 1972, in A-division. Ognjanović started his professional career as a teacher of mathematics at Mathematical Gymnasium Belgrade (Serbian: "Matematička Gimnazija") while still a student of mathematics at Faculty of Mathematics and Natural Sciences, University of Belgrade, continued his career after graduation also in Mathematical Gymnasium Belgrade, and devoted his career to teaching mathematics in the same school, now being a professor in Mathematical Gymnasium Belgrade for more than 30 years.

Students of professor Ognjanović won numerous prizes at International Science Olympiads in Mathematics, Physics, Informatics, Astronomy, Astrophysics, and Earth Sciences, also at other prestigious competitions around the world, and, accordingly, won many full scholarships at top-ranked universities.

Mr Ognjanović is the author of numerous books and collections of problems for elementary and secondary schools, as well as special collections of assignments for preparation for mathematics competitions and mathematics workbooks used as a preparation for admission to faculties.

== Awards and legacy ==
Ognjanović was listed among "300 most powerful people in Serbia" in a list published annually by "Blic" daily newspaper (14 February 2011), member of Axel Springer AG. The criteria were easiness in achieving goals, public awareness, financial and political influence, personal integrity and authority, respectiveness of the institution the person represents, and personal charisma.

Among latest awards for his published works Mr Ognjanović received (in 2010): Grand Prize at 16th International Book Fair, in Novi Sad, from a Business Chamber of Vojvodina, and "Stojan Novaković" Prize for the best textbook and set of textbooks published by Zavod - Serbian State Company of Textbooks.
