= Ivković =

Ivković or Ivkovic (Cyrillic script: Ивковић) is a South Slavic surname, a patronymic derived from the male given name Ivko, a diminutive form of Ivan. It may refer to:

- Branislav Ivković (1952–2025), Serbian presidential candidate in the 2004 election
- Dušan Ivković (1943–2021), Serbian basketball coach
- Dušan Ivković (footballer born 1990) (born 1990), Serbian football player
- Milutin Ivković (1906–1943), Serbian football player
- Saša Ivković (born 1993), Serbian football player
- Slobodan Ivković (1937–1995) Serbian basketball player and coach
- Tomislav Ivković (born 1960), Croatian football player
- Violeta Ivković (born 1957), Serbian journalist and writer
- Vladimir Ivković (1929–1992), Croatian water polo player
