= Sezam =

Sezam was a Bulletin Board System in former Yugoslavia.

Sezam BBS was founded on November 11, 1989, as one of many one phone line / night only Bulletin Board Systems in Belgrade, Yugoslavia. Contrary to many BBS systems dedicated to file downloads, Sezam focused on conferences. The original BBS software, specially developed by Sezam's founders Zoran Životić and Dejan Ristanović, enabled users to share their comments on various topics, such as computers, education, sports, politics.

Within months, Sezam had several thousand users and evolved into a subscription-based system, using 3 phone lines. During the following years it grew to 6, 8, 10 and finally 15 phone lines. Tens of thousands of users from former Yugoslavia used Sezam to communicate and exchange opinions on various subjects. During the media blockade imposed by Milosevic's regime, Sezam was one of very few free media in Serbia.

In 1995 Sezam BBS evolved to SezamPro and become the influential Internet providing system in Serbia. The old BBS system, with more than million messages in the database, still exists (telnet telnet.sezampro.rs) as a monument to the stormy 1990s in Yugoslavia.
