= Belgrade Mathematical Gymnasium =

Mathematics high school in Serbia

Coordinates: 44°48′33.0″N 20°27′41.8″E

- Математичка гимназија Београд; Matematička gimnazija Beograd
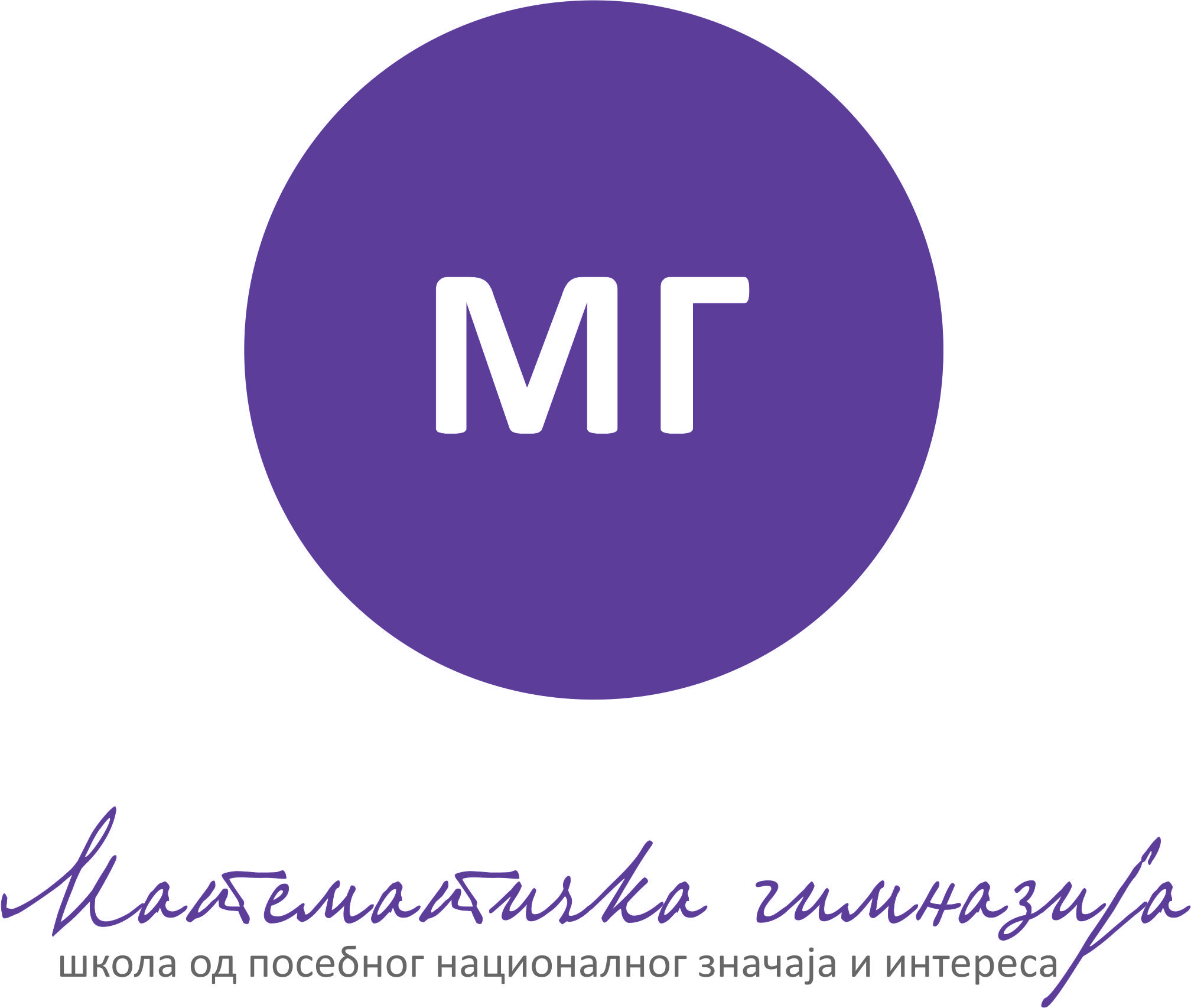

Location
- Kraljice Natalije 37; Belgrade; Serbia, 11000

Information
- Type: State school High school Gymnasium (school); University-preparatory school Day school
- Motto: Vidi se sa slike
- Founded: 1966
- Principal: Mirjana Katić (University of Belgrade)
- Staff: 160 full-time staff: 102 special (specialized) teachers (professors): 58; 25% hold PhD degree 38% hold Master of Science; 16% hold Magister of Science degree 11% hold Ma degree 10% are Graduate students
- Gender: Co-educational
- Age: 12 to 19
- Enrollment: 550 (395 boys, 155 girls)
- Houses: 1
- Colours: Purple and White
- Publication: Informator, Matematički priručnik, MG News Special Mathematics Textbooks for MG; Special Physics Textbooks for MG Special IT Textbooks for MG
- Alumni: Circa 2,000 PhD degree holders
- Website: www.mg.edu.rs

The Belgrade Mathematical Gymnasium (Serbian: Математичка гимназија Београд, Matematička gimnazija Beograd, abbr. "MG" or "MGB"), is a gymnasium high school for students of mathematics, physics and informatics located in Belgrade, Serbia.

The School has a specialised Mathematical Gymnasium Curriculum in mathematics, physics, IT subjects, and supports gifted and talented children. Some of its academic staff are from University of Belgrade, Institute of Physics Belgrade, and Mathematical Institute of Serbian Academy of Sciences and Arts. More than half of the teachers are former students of the school. The average professors' work experience is 18 years.

In 2011, the school had 550 students aged 12–19. There were 155 girls and 395 boys.

== History ==
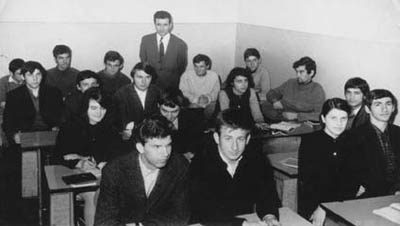
First generation of Mathematical Gymnasium students

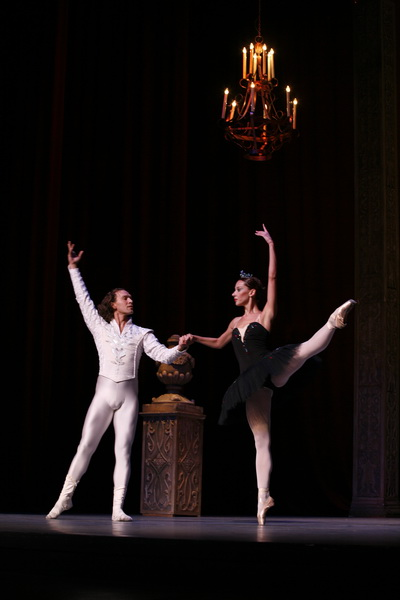
National Theater and Ballet performance, honoring success of Mathematical Gymnasium students at International Mathematics Olympiad and International Physics Olympiad, at one of the schools anniversaries. Mathematics and Physics together, science and human ability to create and destroy, a metaphor by National Ballet dancers in National Opera House. 19 September 2006.

The school was established in 1966, following the model of Kolmogorov School at Moscow University which had been launched in Moscow a year earlier, in 1965.

In 1977, as part of a statewide education reform in former Yugoslavia, the School was merged into the streamlined secondary education (in Serbian: srednje usmereno obrazovanje). Eleven years later, in 1988, the School was officially re-established as a specialized school, this time in the form of an experimental education institution. New curriculum was officially published in 1989, in Official Gazette of Socialist Republic of Serbia, no.2, 15 April 1989.

The "experimental status" finally concluded in 1995, when the School was recognized as a "Specialized school for talented/gifted students in mathematics, informatics, physics, and other natural sciences" by the Serbian Ministry of Education. At the same time, the School was given the status of a "school of special national importance", as the first school of its kind in Yugoslavia.

Although MGB is formally classified as a special secondary school ("srednja škola", grades nine to twelve in the Serbian education system, for funding and other legal reasons), it enrolls experimental classes of the seventh and eighth grade of primary school (age 12 and above). It is the only school in Serbia and in all states formed from former Yugoslavia that has merged elementary school (or part of it) and high school.

Students of Mathematical Gymnasium have the highest grade point average (GPA) compared to students from other schools and the same rule applies to their university studies, whether in Serbia or abroad.

See also: Academic grading in Serbia and Education in Serbia.

== List of school principals ==
The School has had 7 principals in its history, all of whom are authors of university, high school, and elementary school textbooks and accompanying collections of solved problems and questions. Five principals were mathematicians, and one – and the longest-serving principal – was a physicist.

Five MGB principals with Doctor of Sciences titles, and one with Doctor of Science title, earned their degrees at University of Belgrade and served as university professors and as professors at Mathematical Gymnasium.

Year	Principal
1966–1968	Ranko Radovanović, Magister of Sciences, director of Educational and Pedagogical Institute
1968–1971	Dušan Adnađević, Doctor of Sciences in Mathematics, University of Belgrade; Faculty of Natural Sciences and Mathematics, retired
1971–2001	Milan Raspopović, Doctor of Sciences in Physics and Philosophy, University of Belgrade; Faculty of Electrical Engineering, retired
2001–2004	Ljubomir Protić, Doctor of Sciences in Mathematics; University of Belgrade
2004–2008	Vladimir Dragović, Doctor of Sciences in Mathematics, University of Belgrade; Faculty of Mathematics
2008–2019	Srđan Ognjanović, Magister of Sciences, University of Belgrade; Faculty of Mathematics
2019–present	Mirjana Katić, University of Belgrade; Faculty of Mathematics

== Competitions ==
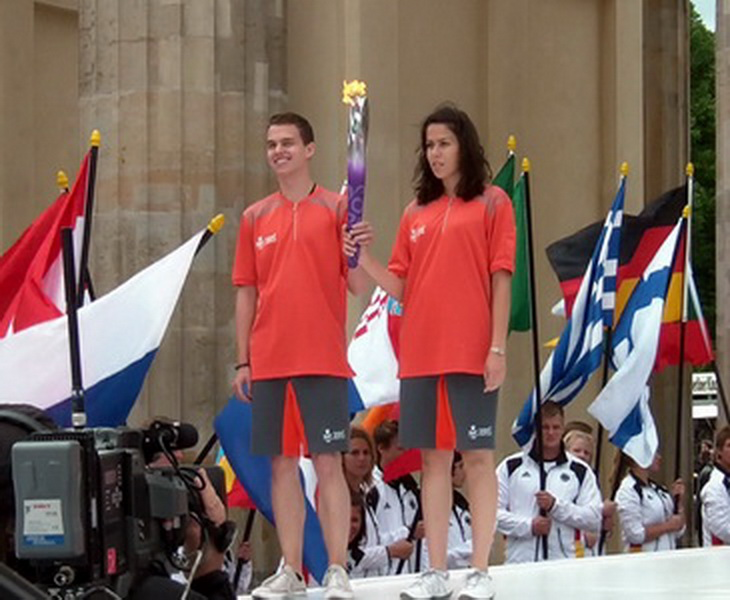
First Youth Olympic Games, Singapore, 14–26 August 2010. 32 representatives of Serbia. Leaders of National Team were Katarina Biserčić (European shooting champion) and Luka Milićević (gold medal winner in mathematics, informatics, and astronomy, from international scientific Olympiads; student of D-division of Mathematical Gymnasium). After graduating in 2010, Luka Milićević received full scholarship and enrolled prestigious Trinity College at University of Cambridge, UK.

The School prepares students for various national and international competitions science competitions. As of 2012 Mathematical Gymnasium students had won several hundred medals from top international competitions around the world. They won 121 medals at International Science Olympiads, about the same number at Junior Olympiads, and about double that number at other top competitions, mostly in USSR, Russia, China, India, and Europe.

=== International Olympiads ===
MGB students have won many national and international awards.

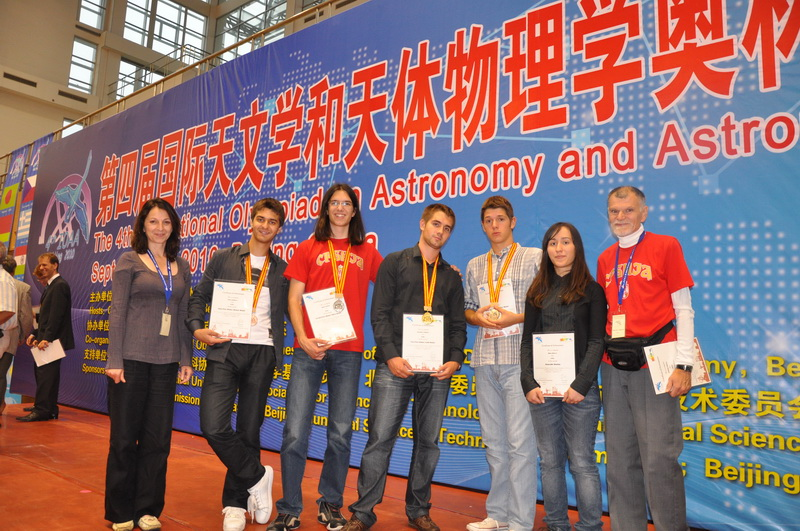
International Olympiad on Astronomy and Astrophysics, China, 12–21 September 2010. Serbia was represented by 5 members team, all of whom were students of MGB. They won 4 medals and one honorable mention: 1 gold, 2 silver, 1 bronze, 1 honorable mention.

Number of medals	Competition
121	International Mathematics Olympiad
52	International Physics Olympiad
23	International Olympiad in Informatics
28	International Astronomy Olympiad
8	International Olympiad on Astronomy and Astrophysics
16	Olympiads in General Science
more than 400	various other international competitions

=== Year 2009 ===
In 2009, during July and August, students of Mathematical Gymnasium won 12 medals in International Olympiads: 5 medals in Olympiads in Mathematics, 4 medals in International Physics Olympiad, 3 medals in International Olympiad in Informatics, 3 medals in International Olympiad on Astronomy and Astrophysics, 1 medal, and 3 honorable mentions in International Astronomy Olympiad.

The total number of gold, silver, and bronze medals, and honorable mentions, won in various international competitions in 2009 is 70.

=== Year 2010 ===
At the 2010 International Mathematics Olympiad (5–15 July 2010, Kazakhstan), Serbia was represented by a team of 6 competitors, all 6 students from the Gymnasium, 15–19 years old. The result is Serbia ranks 10th in the world, with 1 gold, 3 silver, and 1 bronze medal won, and the Mathematical Gymnasium school ranks as the best (rank: 1) school among all special and/or regular schools in the world.

Medals	Competition
1 gold, 3 silver, 2 bronze	51st International Mathematics Olympiad, Kazakhstan
4 bronze	41st International Physics Olympiad, Zagreb, Croatia
1 bronze	22nd International Olympiad in Informatics, Canada
1 gold, 1 silver, 2 bronze, 1 honorable mention.	International Astronomy Olympiad, Crimea, Ukraine
1 gold, 2 silver, 1 bronze, 1 h.m.	International Olympiad on Astronomy and Astrophysics, China
5 gold, 4 silver, 3 bronze	Mathematics, Kolmogorov Special School, International Competition, Moscow, Russia
3 gold, 3 silver	"Archimedes" International Competition in Mathematics, Romania MGB awarded "Absolute Winner" title. MGB student Vukašin Stojisavljević was overall ranked as first.
1 bronze	Balkans Olympiad in Informatics, Montenegro
1 silver, 1 bronze	14th Junior Balkan Mathematical Olympiad, Romania
2 gold, 2 bronze, 2 silver	XXVII Balkan Mathematical Olympiad, Moldavia
2 silver, 2 bronze	Euler's Russian Olympiad in Mathematics, Russia
2 silver, 1 bronze, 1 h.m.	Romanian Master in Mathematics, Romania Romanian Master in Mathematics is an Olympiad for the selections of the 20 top countries in the last International Mathematical Olympiad, i.e. for the best 100 high-school mathematicians in the world
1 silver, 3 bronze	7th Junior Scientific Olympiad, Nigeria
In total: 57 medals, 3 honorable mentions	at some of the major international competitions in 2010.

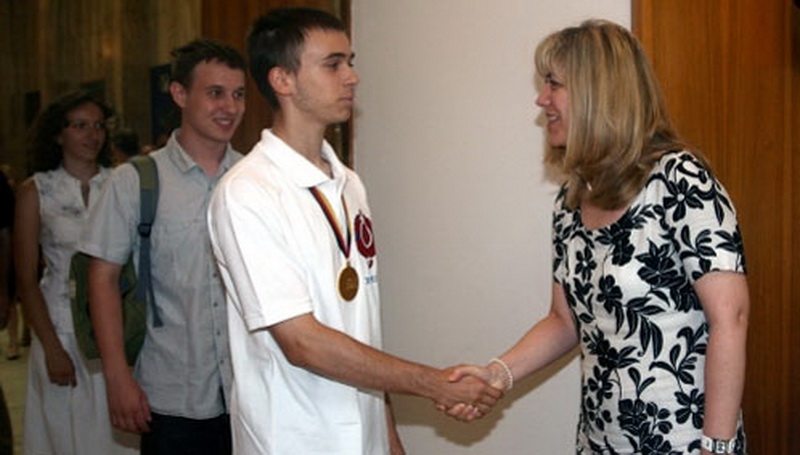
Serbian Minister of Youth and Sports, congratulating MGB students and professors.

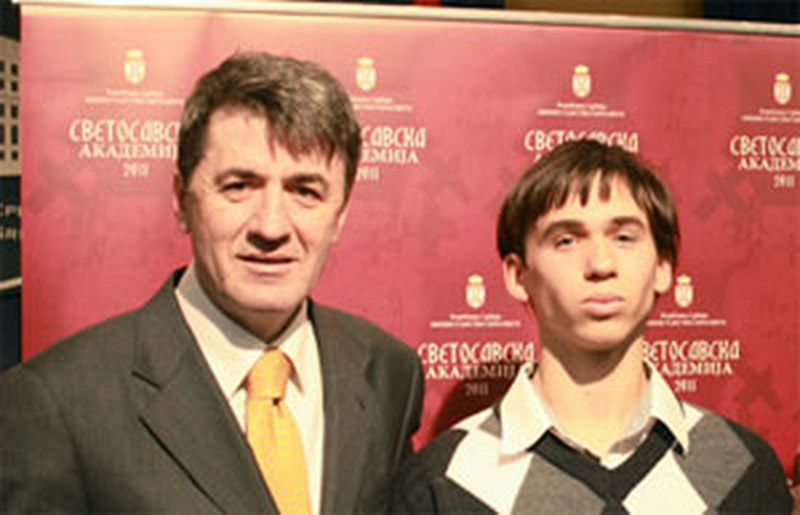
Serbian Minister of Education, congratulating MGB students and professors.

In 2010, students of Mathematical Gymnasium have won 28 medals and honorable mentions namely: at 2010 Olympiad in Mathematics (5–15 July 2010, Kazakhstan) 6 medals: 1 gold, 3 silver, 2 bronze; at Euler's Russian Olympiad in Mathematics (24–27 March 2010, Russia), Mathematical Gymnasium was the only non-Russian competitor and its 4-members team won 4 medals: 2 silver and 2 bronze; in highly selective Romanian Master in Mathematics (24 February – 2 March 2010, Romania): 2 silver and 1 bronze medal, and 1 honorable mention (Romanian Master in Mathematics is an olympiad for the selections of the 20 top countries in the last IMO. The level of the competition is IMO-like. The format had been 4 problems in 5 hours in 2009, in 2010 it was changed to 3 problems in 4 hours, two days format.); at XXVII Balkan Mathematical Olympiad (3–8 May, Moldavia) 6 medals: 2 gold, 2 bronze, 2 silver; at International competition "Archimedes" (7–18 June 2010, Bucharest), Mathematical Gymnasium won the first place, and its 6 students took 6 medals: 3 gold and 3 silver medals; at XIV Junior Balkan Mathematical Olympiad (18–22 June 2010): 1 silver medal and 1 honorable mention.

=== Year 2011 ===
In the All Russian Mathematical Competition, organized by the Kolmogorov Special School, the Mathematical Gymnasium won, "The Absolute First Prize in all categories", and one MGB student, Teodor von Burg, won the gold medal, first prize, and maximum number of points. This is the 2nd time MGB won the Kolmogorov competition.

Medals	Competition
1 gold, 1 silver, 1 honorable mention	Romanian Master in Mathematics, Romania Romanian Master in Mathematics is an Olympiad for the selections of the 20 top countries in the last International Mathematical Olympiad, i.e. for the best 100 high-school mathematicians in the world
so far: 2 medals, 1 honorable mentions	at some of the major international competitions in 2011.

=== Other prizes and awards ===
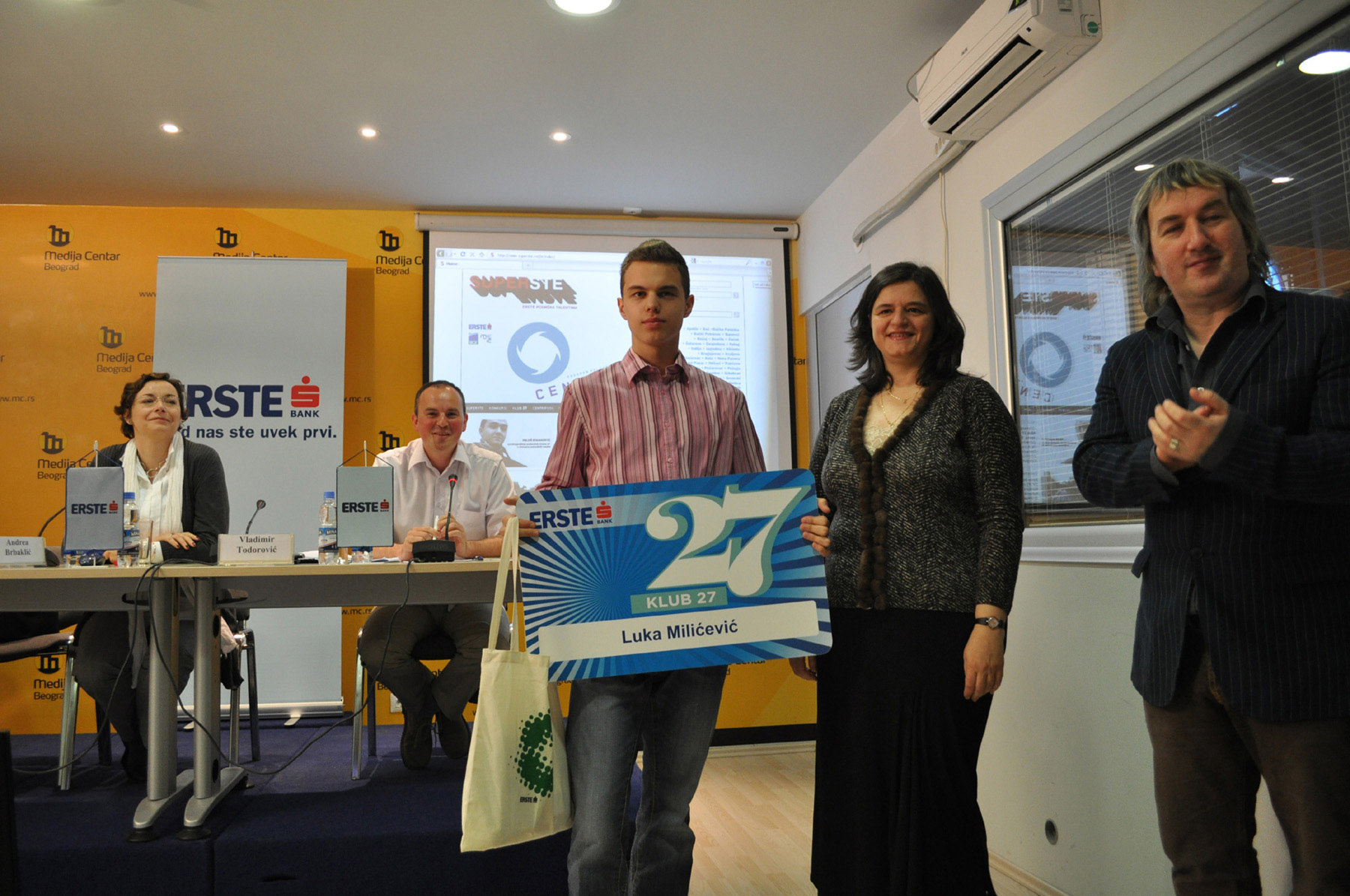
Erste Group Erste Bank Club 27: winner of Grand Prize 2010, Luka Milićević, MGB student

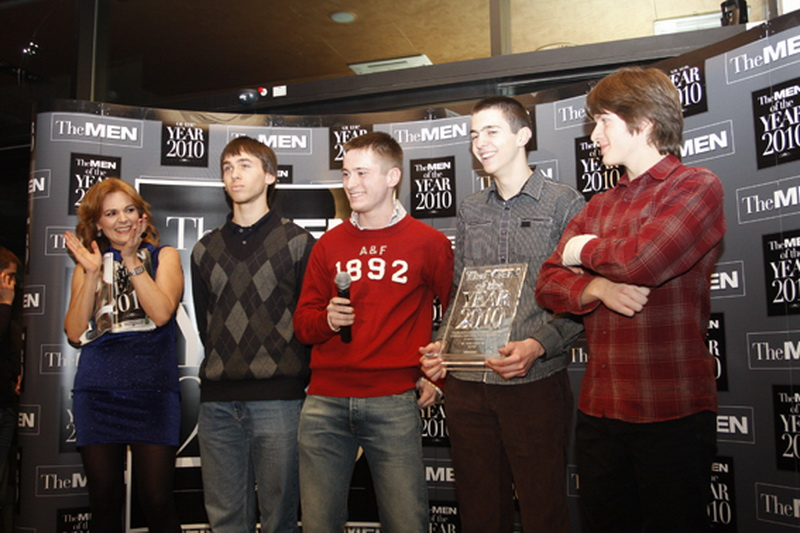
The Men Magazine award "The MEN of the Year 2010" went to 4 MGB students: Teodor fon Burg, Rade Špegar, Stevan Gajović, and Filip Živanović.

Students of school have won many other prizes in addition to the International Science Olympiads.

As part of the "27 Club", which Erste Bank implemented for the third consecutive year in 2010, with the aim to promote talented young people and help them to get well-deserved public recognition for their work and the results, 2010 year's award winners were declared. In the category of science, the winner of a Grand Prize was Luka Milićević, and the winner of Erste Bank Prize in the field of natural and technical sciences and technology was Dušan Milijančević. Both students were final year students of D-division.

At Microsoft's Imagine Cup, students of the school were in the finals, among top 6 teams in the world.

Other numerous medals from the Balkans Olympiads in Mathematics, Physics and Informatics are being won every year.

== Curriculum and core subjects ==
Main areas of study are divided into sub-branches or sub-disciplines. Courses are delivered on a per-semester basis.

=== Mathematics ===
Mathematics is divided into fields of Algebra, Geometry, Linear Algebra, Analytical Geometry, Mathematical Analysis, Probability, Statistics, Numerical Analysis, and Selected Chapters in Mathematics.

=== Physics ===
Physics is taught from Newtonian mechanics, Fluid Dynamics, Waves, Optics, Electricity, Magnetism, to modern physics, usually ending with STR, Relativistic Dynamics, Quantum Theory, Quantum Mechanics, Molecular Physics, Physical Chemistry, Atomic Physics, Solid State Physics, Quantum Optics, Nuclear Physics, Nuclear Engineering, Elementary Particle Physics, introduction to Astrophysics and Cosmology, General Relativity, and some basic introductions to String Theory, Cosmology, and M-Theory.

=== Informatics and computer science ===
There are 5 computer labs in Mathematical Gymnasium, with ca. 110 dual core and quad core computers, and one super-computer. The School operates its own wireless network. Students gain knowledge in programming languages (Pascal, Delphi, C, C++, C#, Java; Fortran; Prolog), operating systems (Windows, Linux, Unix), databases and DBMS (Oracle Database, Microsoft SQL Server, PostgreSQL, MySQL), and in various IT and ICT fields.

There are 10 two-semester (2×19 weeks) IT courses students must pass during schooling. There is one special (additional) week in each semester, reserved for IT subjects only (so called "block classes"), for students to have lessons only in ICT subjects.

=== Business and finance ===
School offers modules in financial mathematics, as well as in business related studies.

=== History of school's IT Department ===
The first professor of programming in MGB was Ljubomir Protić, professor at University of Belgrade, Faculty of Mathematics, who started teaching programming subjects from school year 1968/69.; 33 years later, professor Protić served as Principal of the Mathematical Gymnasium (2001–2004).

Later on, many University of Belgrade professors, primarily from Faculty of Mathematics, Faculty of Electrical Engineering, and Faculty of Physics, as well as from Belgrade Institute of Physics and from Vinča Institute of Nuclear Sciences, joined informatics teaching staff at the Gymnasium.

=== School's IT club ===
CEO of Microsoft Development Center Serbia, Dejan Cvetković, himself a former student and graduate of Mathematical Gymnasium, with students who ranked among best 6 teams in the world, and with Snežana Samardžić Marković, Serbian Minister for youth and sports. Vladan Simov, student, ranked 3rd at this prestigious world competition and won US$3,000 prize from Microsoft.

Programmers club at Faculty of Electrical Engineering was opened by the MG alumni in 1983, by MG alumnus Dejan Ristanović (graduated in 1981). At the same time was opened Programmers club of Mathematical Gymnasium. Dejan Ristanović and MGB alumni founded and run "PC Press" publishing house.

All of part-time ICT teachers and special ICT teachers are former MGB students.

== Sports ==
The school teams regularly play in tournaments in volleyball, handball, basketball, and football. There is an active swimming section each generation has several divers among students. Students can train in karate, taekwondo, judo, and aikido. There are active badminton and table tennis sections. Mountaineering, biking, and hiking are the most popular outdoor activities.

Yachting was very popular during the eighties and nineties, and the School had national team members who competed around the world.

== Notable alumni ==
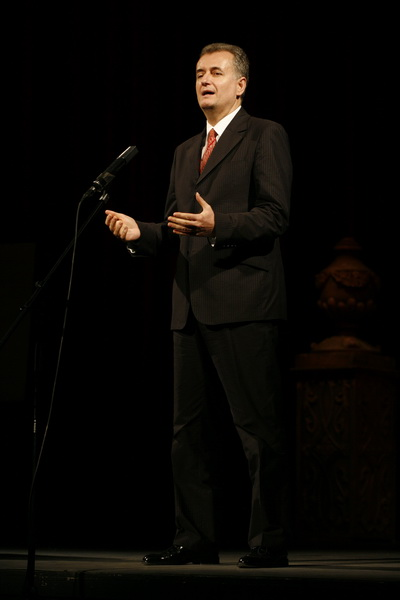
Belgrade Mayor, Mr. Nenad Bogdanović (deceased), giving speech at the MGB anniversary. Mr. Bogdanović was an alumnus, graduated 1973.

Notable alumni include athletes Slobodan Soro and Rajko Jokanović, chess player Alisa Marić, former Minister of Telecommunications and Information Society in the Government of Serbia Aleksandra Smiljanić, and former Mayor of Belgrade Nenad Bogdanović.

== Sponsorships ==
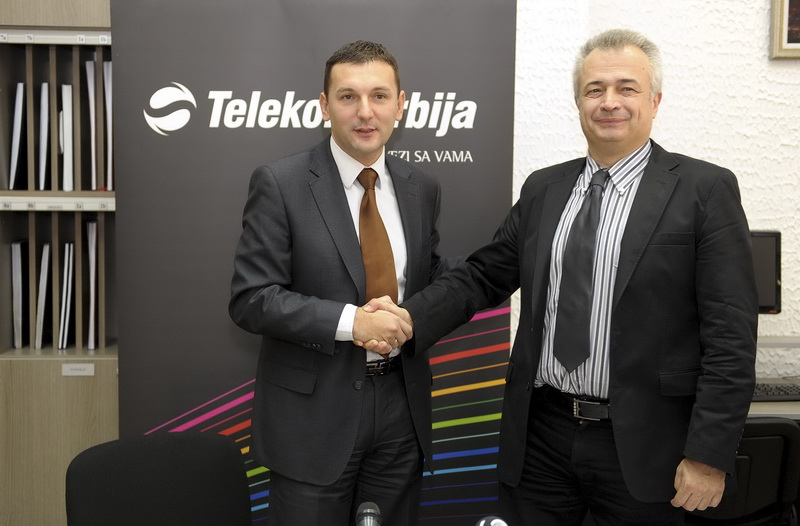
Telekom Serbia CEO Mr. Branko Radujko and MGB Director Srđan Ognjanović, after they signed a contract. Telecom Serbia invest in telecommunication infrastructure of MGB.

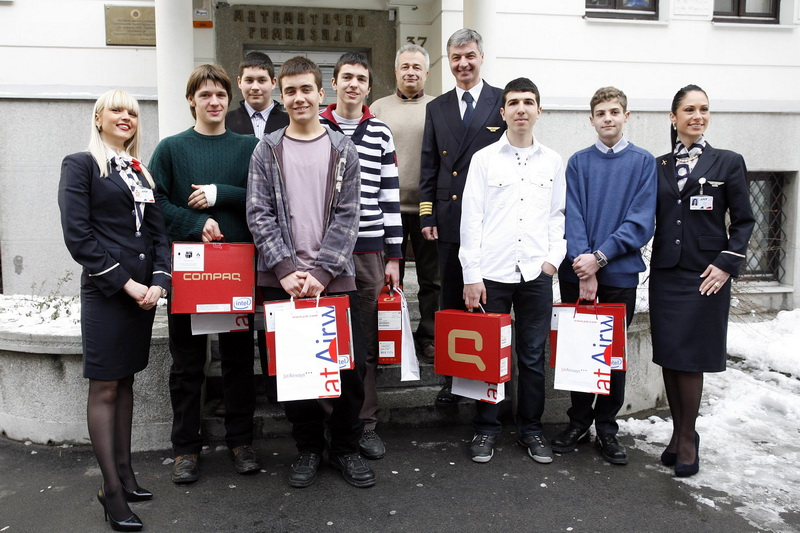
JAT Airways and MGB representatives signed a contract. JAT Airways invest in travel costs of MGB students at the top international competitions.

Mathematical Gymnasium has been sponsored by JAT Airways (national air-traffic company), Telekom Srbija (Telecom Serbia, the largest telecom operator in former Yugoslavia and in modern Serbia), and the Serbian Academy of Sciences and Arts,

== Distinguished guests ==
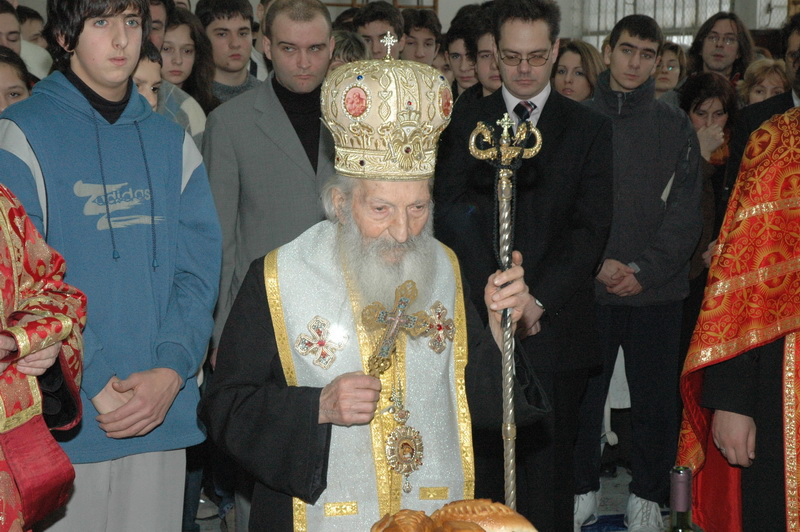
Students with the Archbishop of Peć during his visit to the Mathematical Gymnasium, 25 January 2005. To the right of the archbishop is Principal Vladimir Dragović.

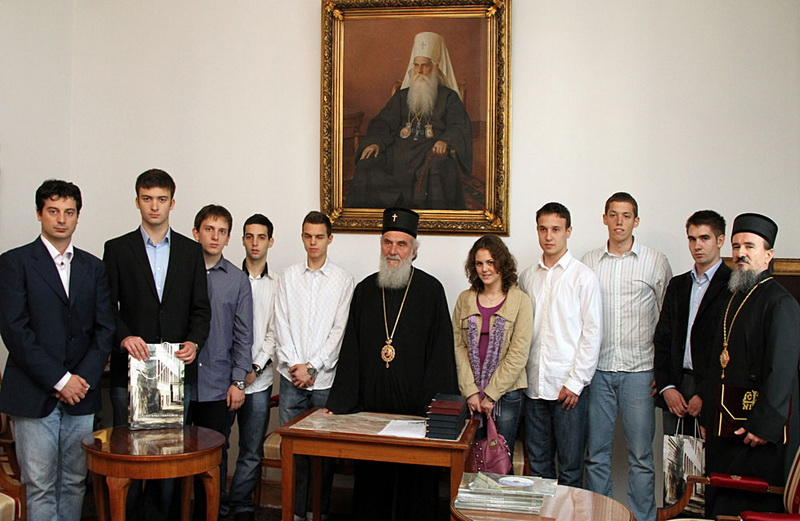
Students with the Archbishop of Peć and Episcop (Bishop) Atanasije. 22 June 2010.

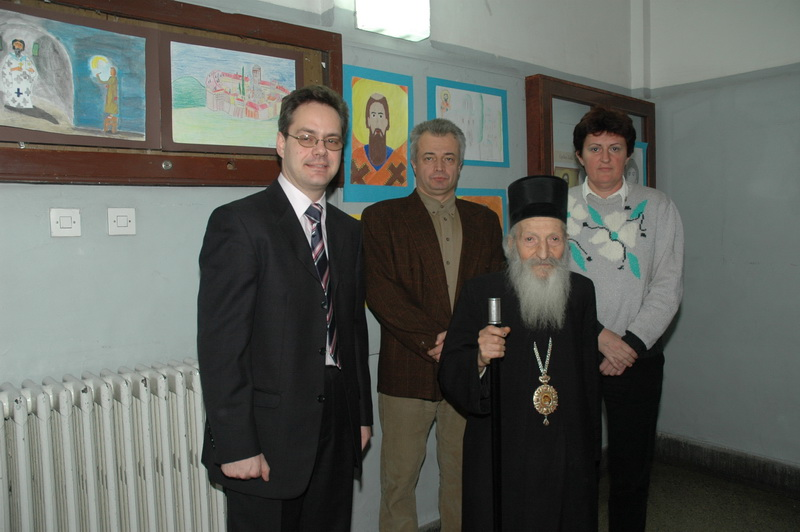
Visit of the Archbishop of Peć. In this picture, viewers left to right, are: Principal Vladimir Dragović; acting Principal Srđan Ognjanović, Archbishop of Peć, professor Nataša Čaluković.

Mathematical Gymnasium has been visited by many distinguished guests. Among notable guests outside the world of mathematics, physics and informatics, were, during last 5 years only (i.e. after 2005), among many others:

- former Serbian Prime Minister Zoran Đinđić,
- Serbian President Boris Tadić,
- former Belgrade Mayor Nenad Bogdanović, himself an alumnus of MGB,
- then Serbian Prime Minister Vojislav Koštunica,
- Serbian Patriarch Pavle,
- Serbian Patriarch Irinej,
- Alexander, Crown Prince of Yugoslavia,
- Katherine, Crown Princess of Yugoslavia,
- Kim Young-Hee, Ambassador of the Republic of Korea.

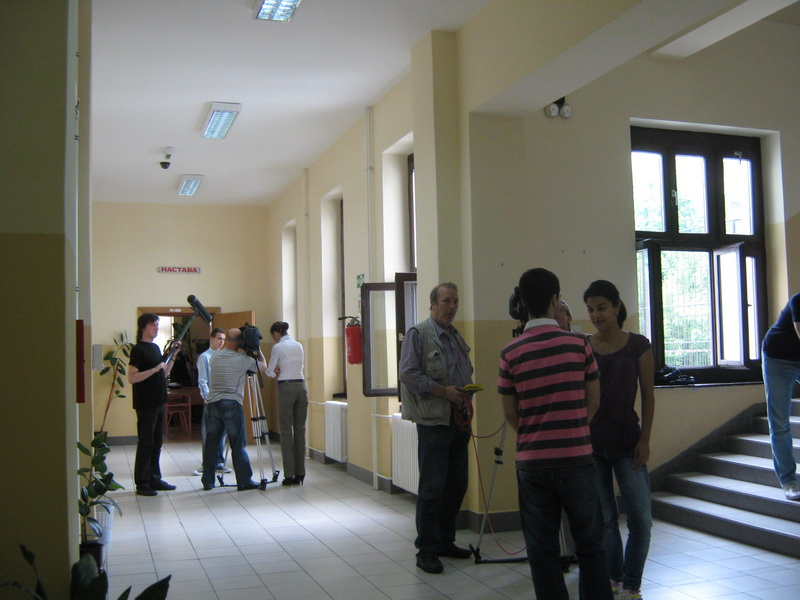
Michael O'Sullivan, Director of the Cambridge Commonwealth Trust, visited Mathematical Gymnasium. This event was recorded by the Radio Television of Serbia, and students who received at least two scholarships were interviewed. 21 June 2010.

On Monday, 21 June 2010, Michael O'Sullivan, Director of the Cambridge Commonwealth Trust paid visit to the school.

== Legal status ==
The School operates as a public school and acts as a member of Serbian education system, which is governed by the Ministry of Education.

Formally a part of former Yugoslav and now Serbian state educational system (i.e. financed by the state), the Mathematical Gymnasium had a status of "experimental school", which allowed it to operate autonomously since its foundation.

It has funding independent from general high school funding and is helped both by the state and by the University of Belgrade. University pay scale applies to all employees.

The school has the following legal statuses:

- "Experimental school whose aim is to reinforce mathematical education for students which show a special gift for mathematics and natural sciences", according to the decision of the Educational Council of SR Serbia (Decision no. 110-32/89 from 18 January 1989);
- "School for talented students in the areas of mathematics and natural sciences", according to the decision of the Ministry of Education of Serbia;
- "School of special national interest", according to the decision of the Government of the Republic of Serbia. (please see picture on the right)

== Building and facilities ==
The school's main building has an area of 2,144.98 m^{2}, not including basement labs.

It has 11 specialized classrooms (5 for informatics related subjects, 2 for physics, 1 for mathematics, 1 for chemistry, 1 for biology, 1 for foreign languages), 1 server room with equipment for administration of over 100 LAN and WLAN stations in the School, 13 large classrooms and 3 smaller classrooms for mentor teaching and preparation for competitions. Other rooms include the assembly hall, the ceremonial hall, a library with over 10,000 books and textbooks and a mediatheque, basement laboratories, the MG TV studio(a student run YouTube program), administrative staff rooms, cleaning staff rooms, secretary's office, accounting department, copy center, psychologist's office, and the offices of the principal and vice principal.
