= Cambridge Commonwealth Trust =

Cambridge Commonwealth, European & International Trust
- Abbreviation: CCT
- Formation: 1982; 44 years ago
- Type: Trust (United Kingdom)
- Headquarters: Cambridge, UK (United Kingdom)
- Region served: Worldwide
- Method: Scholarships
- Key people: Prince of Wales
- Website: www.cambridgetrust.org

The Cambridge Commonwealth, European & International Trust is a charitable organisation that offers scholarships to domestic and international students who have been accepted for admission to the University of Cambridge in England. It is the largest provider of scholarships at the University, supporting around 1,500 students each year.

On 1 August 2013. the Cambridge Commonwealth Trust and the Cambridge Overseas Trust was merged to form "The Cambridge Commonwealth, European and International Trust". The merged entity continues to provide financial support for international students on degree courses at the University of Cambridge.

== Patron & Governance ==
King Charles III has served as Patron since 2010. In 2024 he launched King’s Cambridge Commonwealth Scholarships for Small Island Nations in partnership with the Cambridge Trust, building upon the previous programme of Climate Action Scholarships, and the HRH The Prince of Wales Scholarships for Small Island Nations, which the Cambridge Trust and the University of Cambridge established in 2022 to support students from this region to address climate change.

The Cambridge Trust is governed by a board of Trustees:

- Professor Pippa Rogerson, Chair of Trustees
- Sir Laurie Bristow KCMG
- Professor Dame Madeleine Atkins DBE, DL, FAcSS
- Professor Catherine Barnard FBA, FLSW, FRSA
- Iain N. Drayton
- Professor Duncan Maskell
- Dr David Secher
- Helen Watson
- Dr Toby Wilkinson

== Scholarships ==
The Trust scholarships usually cover tuition fees with some including living and travel costs. All students, regardless of nationalities, are eligible for consideration of the scholarships. Scholarships are granted after the students have fulfilled the admissions requirements to the University of Cambridge.

The types of scholarships include:

- Undergraduate studies
- Graduate (including masters and PhDs)

Scholarships include Cambridge Africa Changemakers Scholarship, the Cambridge Trust International Scholarship and The Rowan Williams Cambridge Studentship, created in 2018 and named after the former Archbishop of Canterbury, and former chair of the Cambridge Trust and master of Magdalene College, who has supported 72 undergraduate and postgraduate students to date.

Applicants are put forward by their respective colleges when admitted and only students who are in financial need will be considered. Every year, the Trust awards about 400 scholarships to international students to study at Cambridge. According to DAWN, the country that topped the list of students securing the scholarships is China, followed by the US, and India. Scholars were named as "Cambridge Commonwealth Trust Scholar" in the past. Currently, "Cambridge International Scholar" and "Cambridge Trust Scholar" are used for the awardees.

== Alumni ==
After many years since its formation, thousands of scholars have benefitted from the financial aid given by the Trust. The Trust maintains a list of existing scholars and past scholars. It also provides a platform for these scholars to keep in touch and network with each other. The trusts also hold social events for the scholars to meet and interact.
