= Galaksija (magazine) =

Defunct Yugoslavian science and technology magazine

- Vol. 1, no. 127, November 1982
- Categories: Computer magazines
- Frequency: Monthly
- Publisher: BIGZ
- First issue: March 1972; 54 years ago
- Final issue: 2001; 25 years ago
- Country: Yugoslavia
- Based in: Belgrade, SR Serbia
- Language: Serbian
- ISSN: 0350-123X

Galaksija was a monthly magazine for popularization of science and science fiction that was published in Yugoslavia from 1972 to the 1990s by BIGZ. Its headquarters was in Belgrade.

The Računari computer magazine was initially a special edition of Galaksija in December 1983.

Another project launched by the magazine was the Galaksija home computer constructed by Voja Antonić. Its do-it-yourself schematics were first published by Galaksija.

== Editors ==
- 1972-1987 Gavrilo Vučković
- 1987-1989 Stanko M. Stojiljković
- 1989-1991 Aleksandar Petrović
- 1991-1995 Rade Grujić
- 1995-2001 Borislav Soleša
