= Dejan Ristanović =

Serbian writer and computer publicist (1963–2025)

- Дејан Ристановић
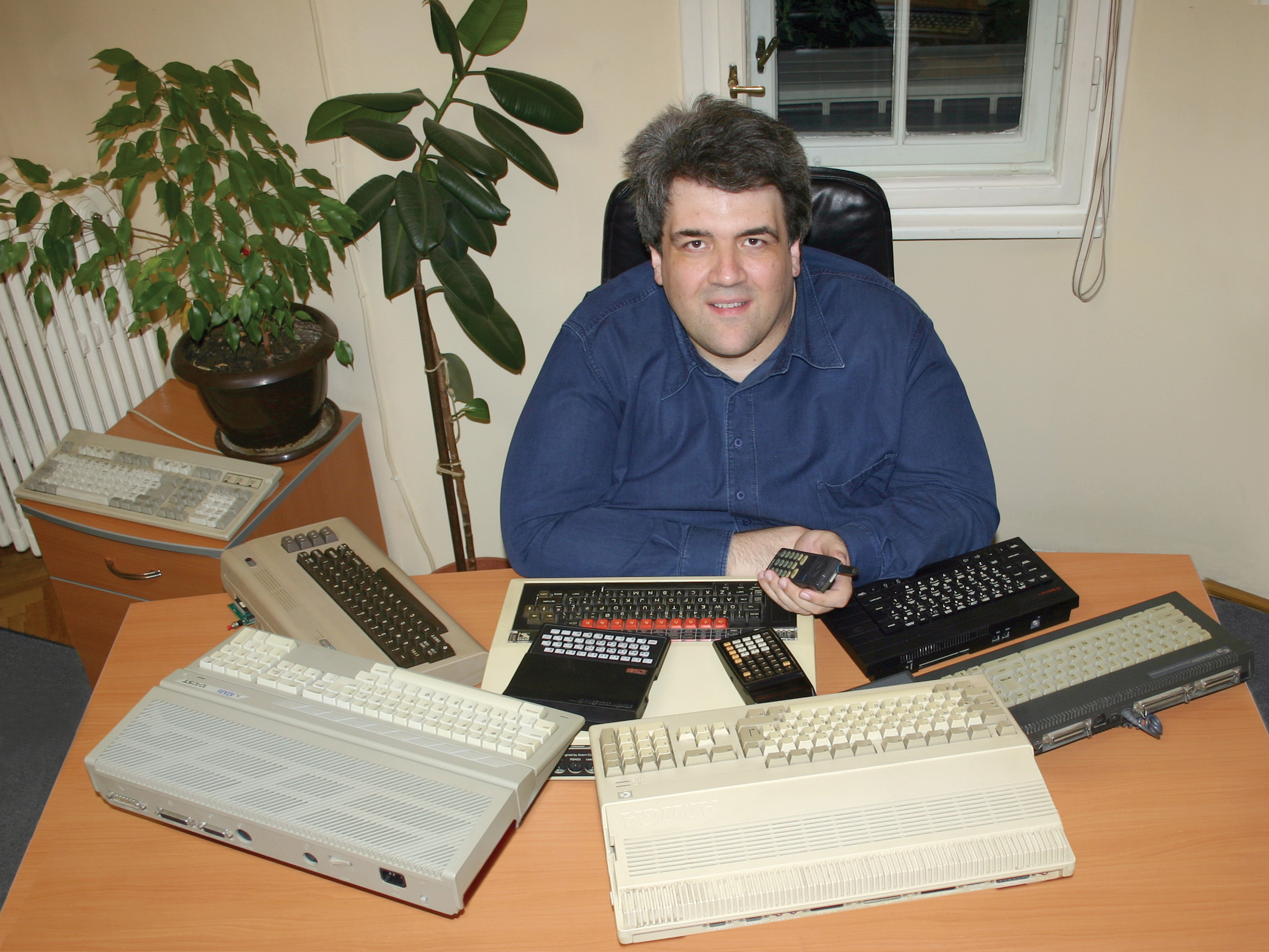
- Ristanović with computers from the 1980s
- Born: 16 April 1963; Belgrade, SR Serbia, SFR Yugoslavia
- Died: 10 November 2025 (aged 62); Belgrade, Serbia
- Occupations: Writer and computer publicist

Dejan Ristanović (Serbian Cyrillic: Дејан Ристановић; 16 April 1963 – 10 November 2025) was a Serbian writer and computer publicist.

== Life and career ==
Ristanović was born in Belgrade on 16 April 1963. In January 1981, he wrote the first article on personal computers for the popular science magazine Galaksija (Galaxy). During the following years he wrote many articles about programmable calculators and home computers.

In December 1983, he wrote a special edition of Galaksija called "Computers in Your Home" (Računari u vašoj kući), the first computer magazine in former Yugoslavia. This issue featured entire schematic diagrams guides on how to build computer Galaksija, created by Voja Antonić.

The series of special editions was eventually developed into computer magazine Računari (Computers). Ristanović was a contributor of Računari for 11 years. After that, in 1995 Ristanović founded the PC Press publishing company and magazine PC, the first privately owned computer magazine in Serbia. Ristanović has been the editor-in-chief of PC for more than 10 years.

In 1989, he co-founded Sezam BBS, which eventually become a major BBS system and evolved to Internet provider Sezam Pro, which in 2009 merged in Orion Telecom.

Ristanović was the author of about 20 books and more than 500 magazine articles about computers, written in the Serbian and English languages. He also operated the www.ti59.com nostalgia home page of TI-59 programmable calculators.

He was alumnus of Mathematical Gymnasium Belgrade.

Ristanović died after short illness on 10 November 2025, at the age of 62.
