= Vladimir Dragović =

Serbian mathematician (born 1967)

Vladimir Dragović Владимир Драговић
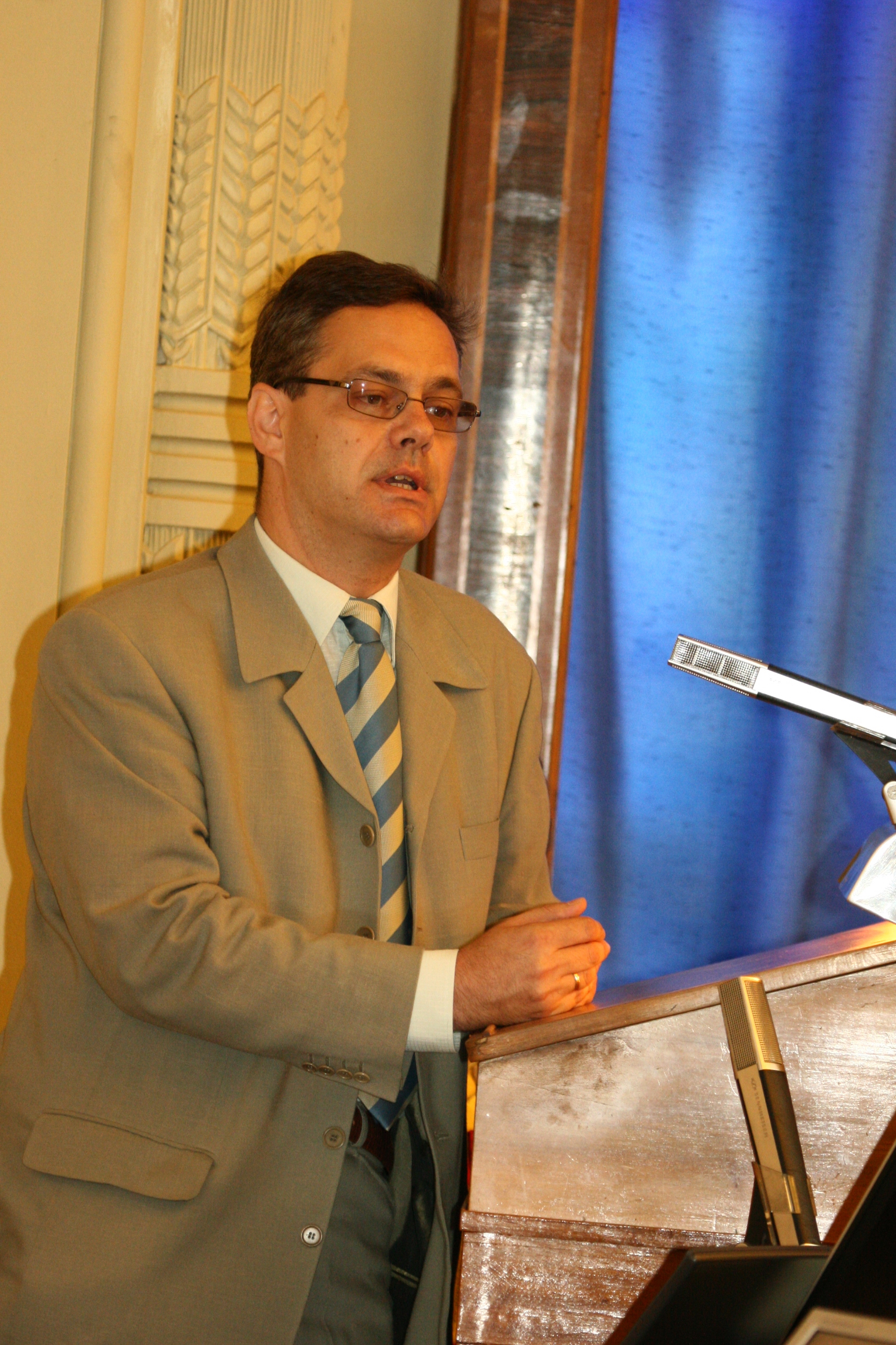
- Dragović in 2008

5th director of Matematička gimnazija
- In office 2004–2008
- Preceded by: Ljubomir Protić, dr sci mathematics, Faculty of Mathematics, University of Belgrade
- Succeeded by: Srđan Ognjanović, dr sci mathematics, Faculty of Mathematics, University of Belgrade

Vladimir Dragović (born 1967 in Belgrade, SR Serbia) is Professor and Head of the Mathematical Sciences Department at the University of Texas at Dallas. Prior to this he was a Full Research Professor at Serbian Academy of Sciences and Arts, the founder and president of the Dynamical Systems group and co-president of The Centre for Dynamical Systems, Geometry and Combinatorics of the Mathematical Institute of the Serbian Academy of Sciences and Arts.

Dragović graduated and received his Doctor of Sciences in Mathematics degree at the Faculty of Mathematics, University of Belgrade, in Belgrade, Serbia, former Socialist Federal Republic of Yugoslavia.

Dragović is the author and co-author of numerous books and collections of problems for elementary and secondary schools, as well as special collections of assignments for preparation for mathematics competitions, and mathematics workbooks used as a preparation for admission to faculties.

== Education ==
- 1987 B.Sc. in Mathematics, University of Belgrade (graduated in 3 years, instead of 4)
- 1988–1992 aspirant at Moscow State University, Faculty of Mechanics and Mathematics, Department for Higher Geometry and Topology
- 1992 Doctor of Sciences in Mathematics, University of Belgrade

Thesis: "R-matrices and algebraic curves", advisor: Boris Dubrovin, Moscow State University

== Scientific work ==
Vladimir Dragović is the author of numerous research works in mathematics, mainly focused on algebraic geometric methods in dynamical systems theory. He is the coauthor, along with Milena Radnović, of the book Poncelet Porisms and Beyond.

- Chairman of the Seminar Mathematical Methods of Mechanics since its founding in 1993.
- Advisor for four M.Sc. theses and three PhD theses at Department of Mathematics, University of Belgrade.
- 2001–2007 Member of the Committee for mathematics and mechanics of the Ministry for Science of Serbia
- 2002–2005 Leader of Project 1643 of the Ministry for Science of Serbia
- since 2006 Leader of Project 144014 of the Ministry for Science of Serbia
- since 2005 Leader of the Italian-Serbian project geometry, topology and combinatorics of manifolds and dynamical systems

== Visiting Positions ==
- 1999–2000 Department of Mathematics, Kyoto University, Japan
- 2000–2003 International School for Advanced Studies (SISSA), Trieste, Italy
- 2008–present University of Lisbon, Portugal
- 2008 Institute of Advanced Scientific Studies (IHES), Paris, France

== Invited lectures and addresses ==
- 2000 ITEP, Moscow, Russia
- 2004 ICTP, Trieste, Italy
- 2005 IMPA, Rio de Janeiro, Brazil
- 2005 ICTP, Trieste, Italy
- 2006 ICTP, Trieste, Italy
- 2006 University of Bielsko-Biała, Poland
- 2007 Montenegrin Academy of Sciences and Arts
- 2007 SISSA, Trieste, Italy
- 2007 University of Lisbon, Portugal
- 2008 Polytechnical University of Catalonia, Barcelona, Spain

== Other academic positions and duties ==
- 1992–2007 Special professor (Teacher with special assignments, in special divisions for gifted pupils) in Mathematical Gymnasium Belgrade
- 2004–2008 Principal, Mathematical Gymnasium Belgrade
- 1993–1998 Faculty of Mathematics, University of Belgrade; courses: Differential Geometry, several graduate courses
- 1996–1999 Head of the Committee for mathematical competitions of high school students of Serbia
- 1996–1999 Department of Philosophy, University of Nis; courses: Differential Geometry, Partial Differential Equations
- 2003–2008 Department of Sciences and Mathematics, University of Montenegro; courses: Geometry, Analysis and Geometry on Riemann Surfaces, Integrable Dynamical Systems 1, Integrable Dynamical Systems 2
- since 2004 regular associate member of ICTP Abdus Salam, Trieste, Italy
- 2004–2008 head of the Mathematical High School, Belgrade

== Awards ==
- 2004 Award of the Union of mathematical societies of Serbia and Montenegro for achievements in mathematical sciences for at most 40-year-old researchers.
