= Zoran Modli =

Serbian journalist (1948–2020)

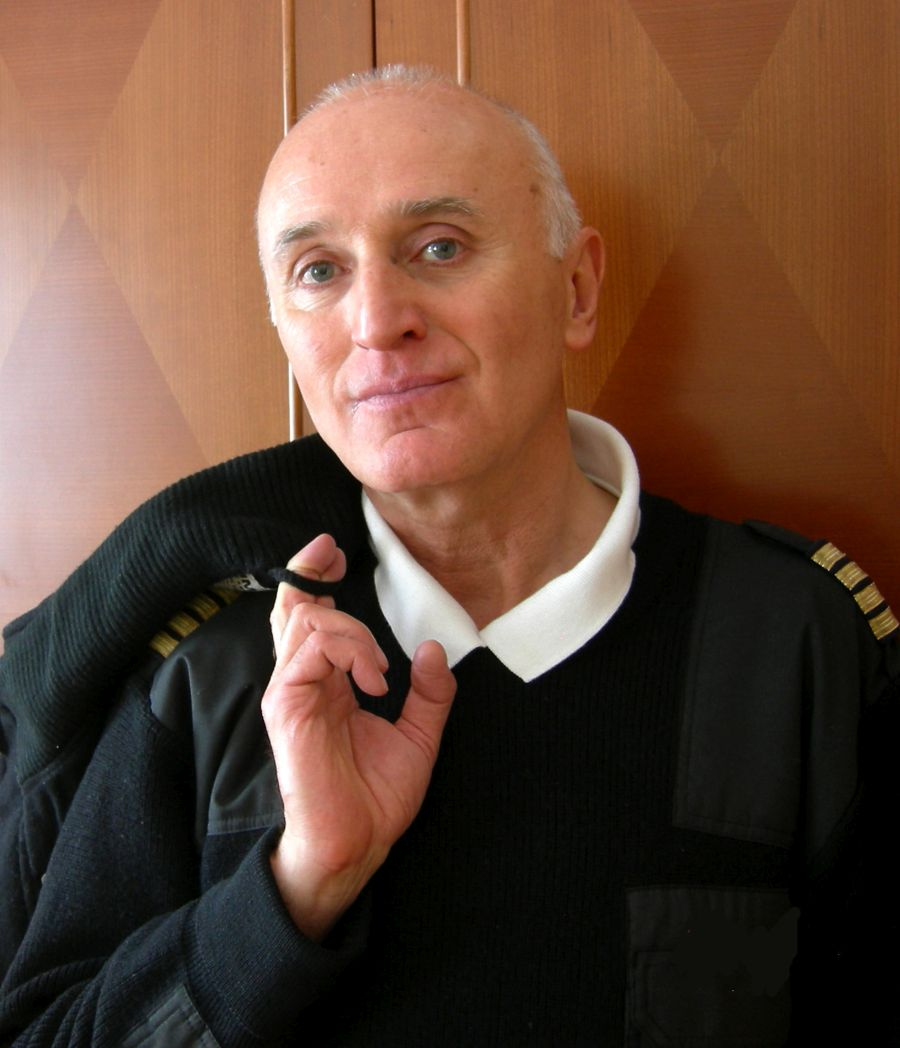
- Modii in 2019
- Born: 22 April 1948
- Died: 23 February 2020 (aged 71)
- Occupations: Aviator, journalist

Zoran Modli (Serbian Cyrillic: Зоран Модли; 22 April 1948 – 23 February 2020) was a Serbian journalist, radio DJ, and aviator. He was one of the most popular Yugoslav radio personalities, running one of the most notable radio shows of the early 1980s in Yugoslavia, Ventilator 202.

== Biography ==
Modli was born in Zemun, PR Serbia, FPR Yugoslavia. He wrote the lyrics for the A-side of the second single by the rock band YU grupa, released in 1972. The song is titled "U tami disko kluba". Ventilator 202 became best known for publishing the first demo recordings of some bands that were yet to become very popular all across Yugoslavia, such as EKV, Partibrejkers, and Rex Ilusivii. Modli left the show in 1987. He ran a successful radio show Modulacije in the 1990s, and since 2000 he ran ZAIR (Zakon akcije i reakcije), a radio show about the new technologies, that is broadcast on numerous Serbian radio stations. He was also a writer, author of numerous commercials and an expert in the fields of technical innovations and computer science.

Modli was a professional pilot for over 30 years. He spent the first 20 years in the state-owned Jat Airways, piloting a Boeing 727, and then moved to a private airlines company Prince Aviation. On 15 July 2010, Modli survived a landing accident at the Bol Airport in Croatia, piloting a Cessna Citation II, when the plane ran off the runway and caught fire. All the passengers survived without injuries, but Modli left his job, as he considered that bad landing procedure was his own mistake. This was also the reason why in the first chapter of his next book, the "Pilot Book" (2012), Modli described this flight in detail, in order to alert future young pilots to never overestimate their own abilities so as not to repeat the mistake he had made. Modli died in Belgrade, where he ran ZAIR and maintained a personal website that was proclaimed one of the best 50 in Serbia in 2001, 2003 and 2004 by a professional computer magazine PC Press.

== Gallery ==
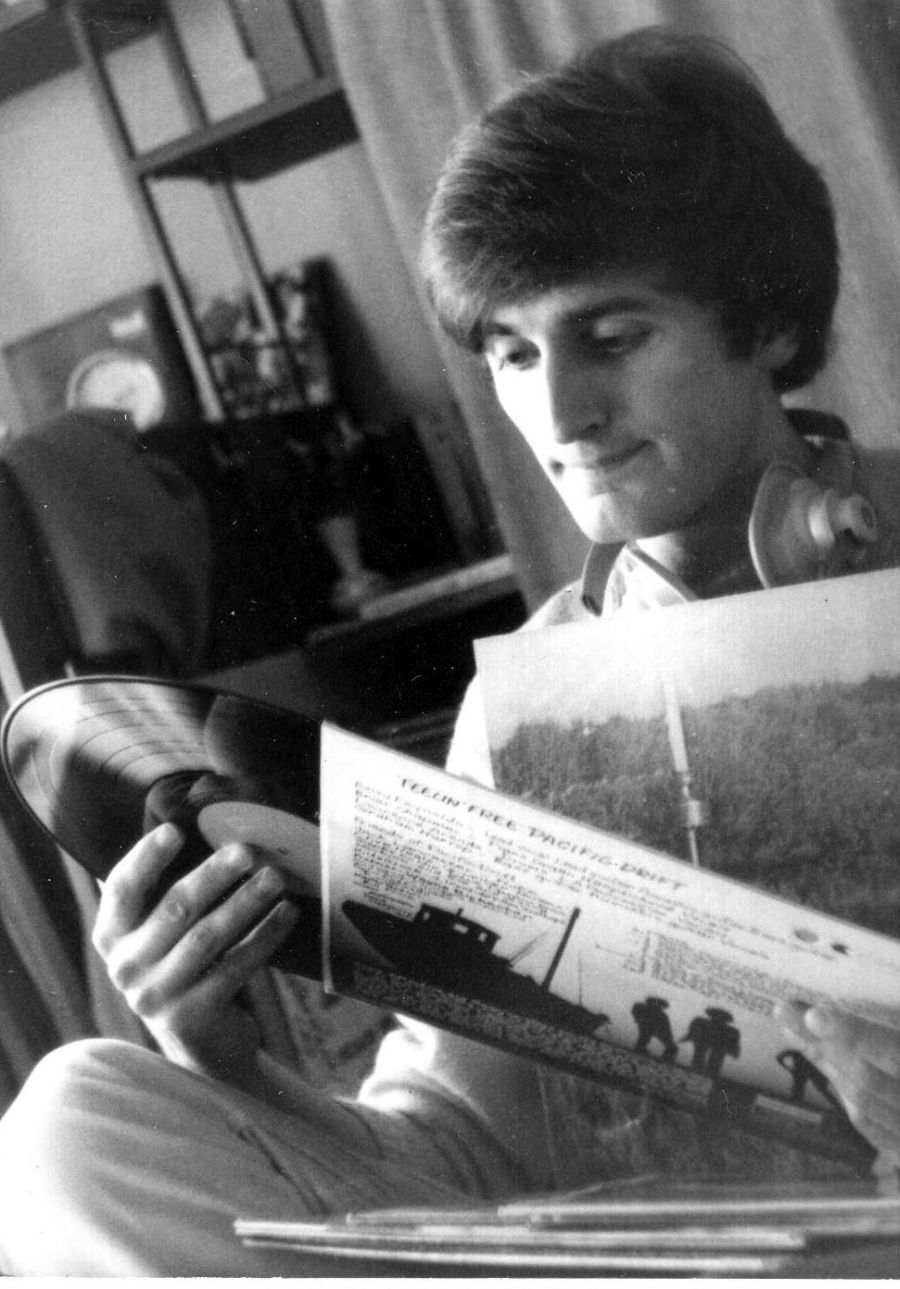

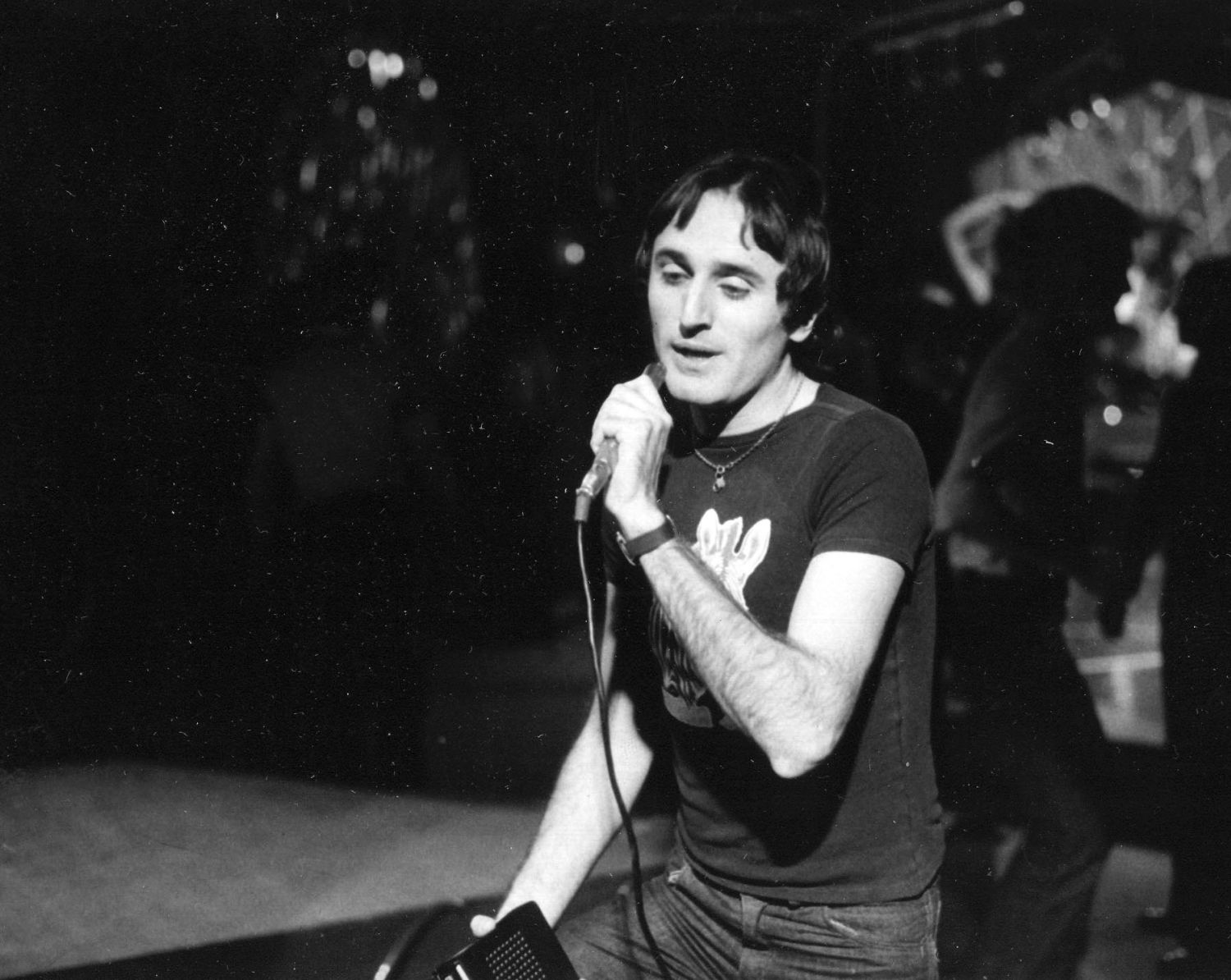

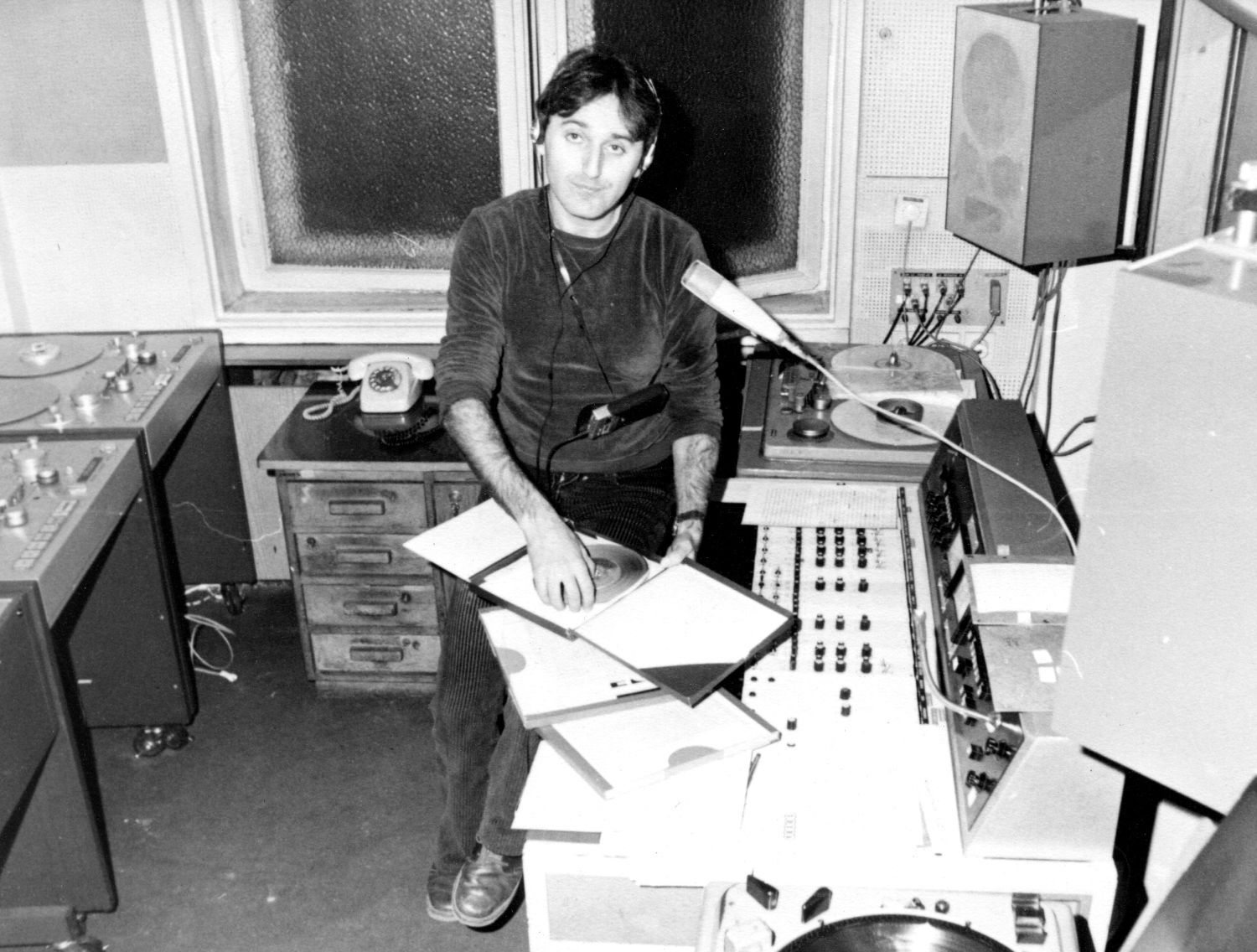

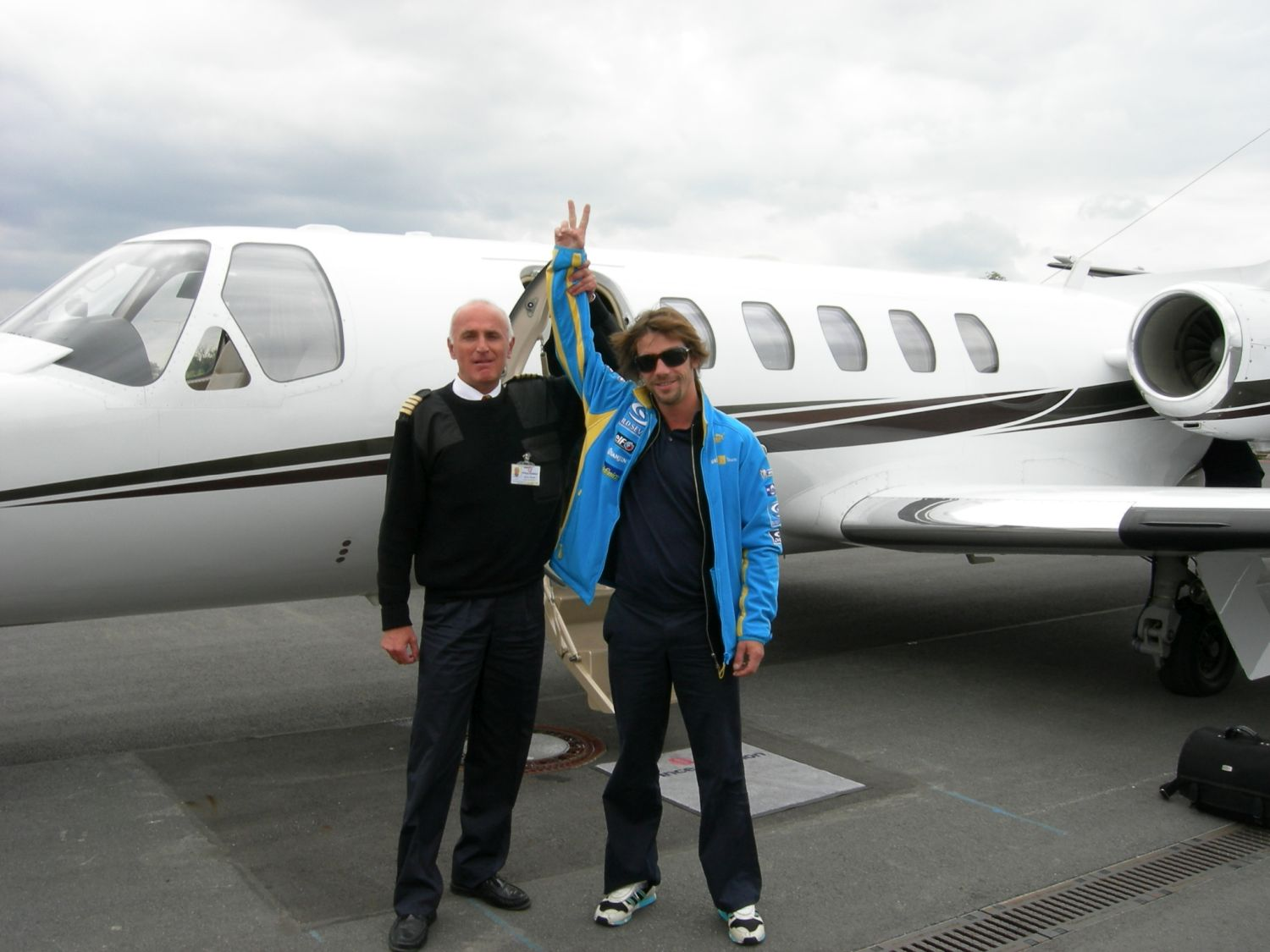

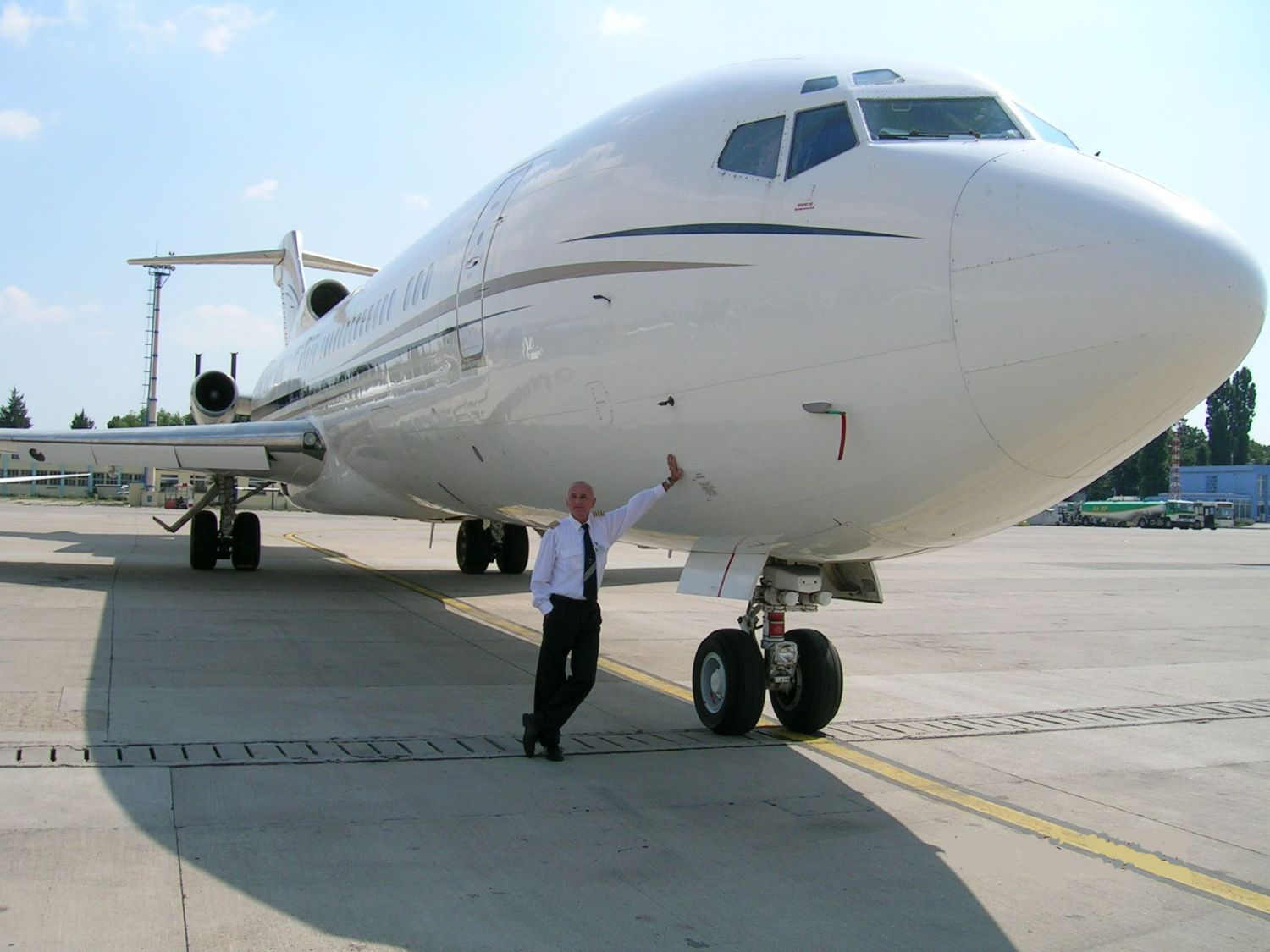

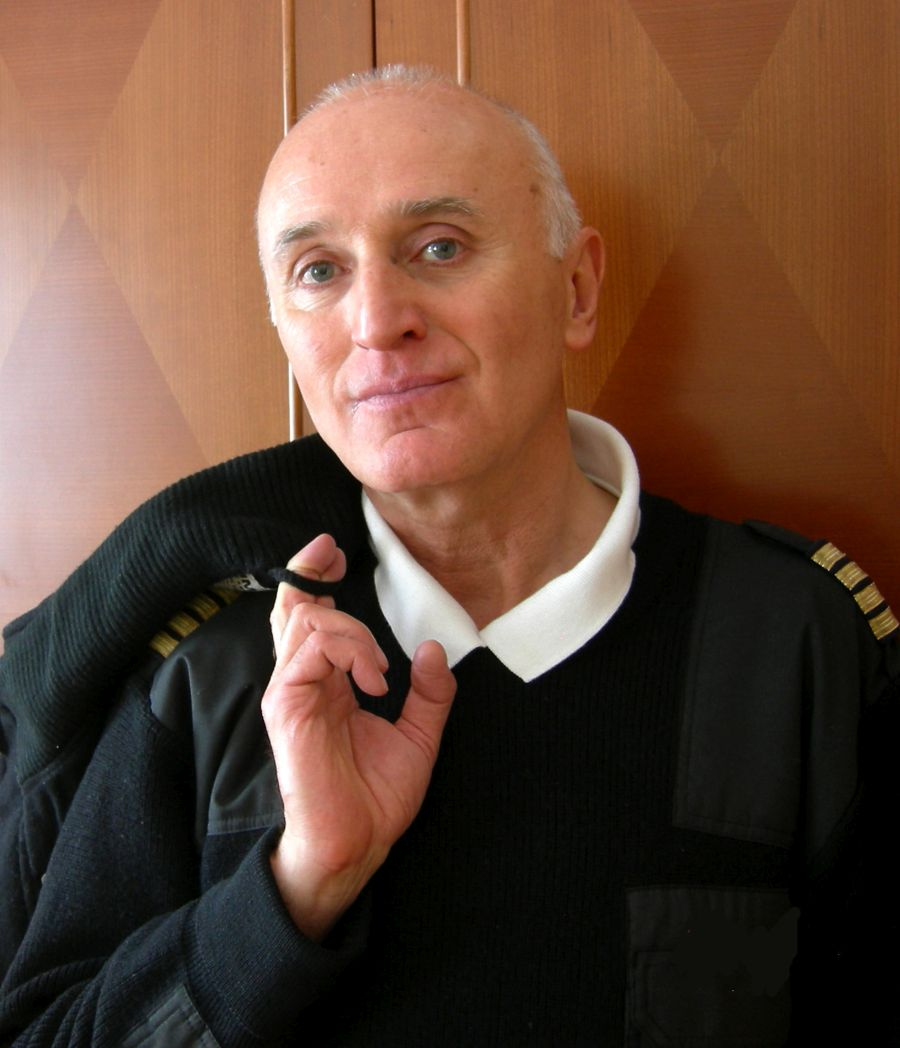

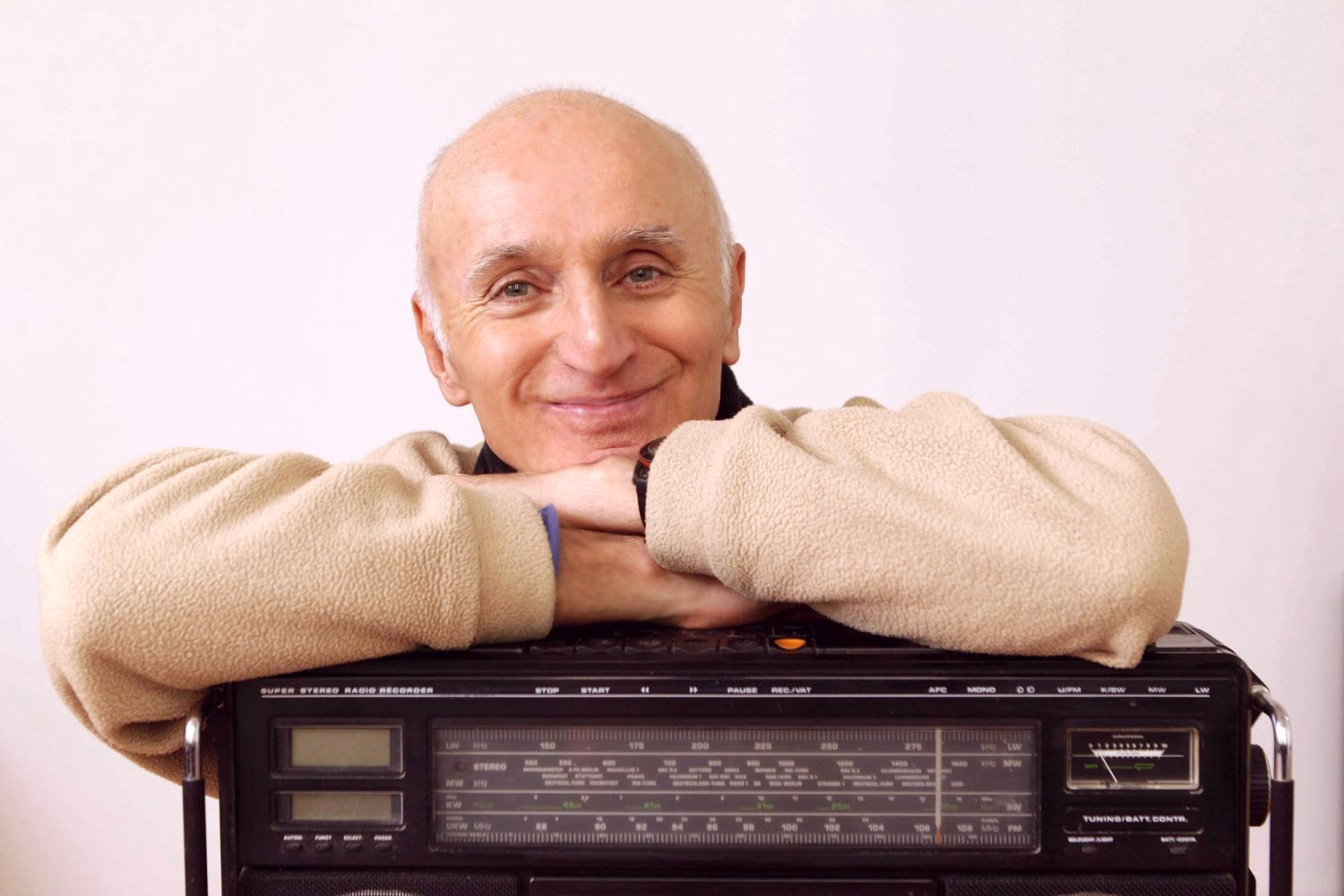
