= Voja Antonić =

Serbian inventor, journalist and writer (born 1952)

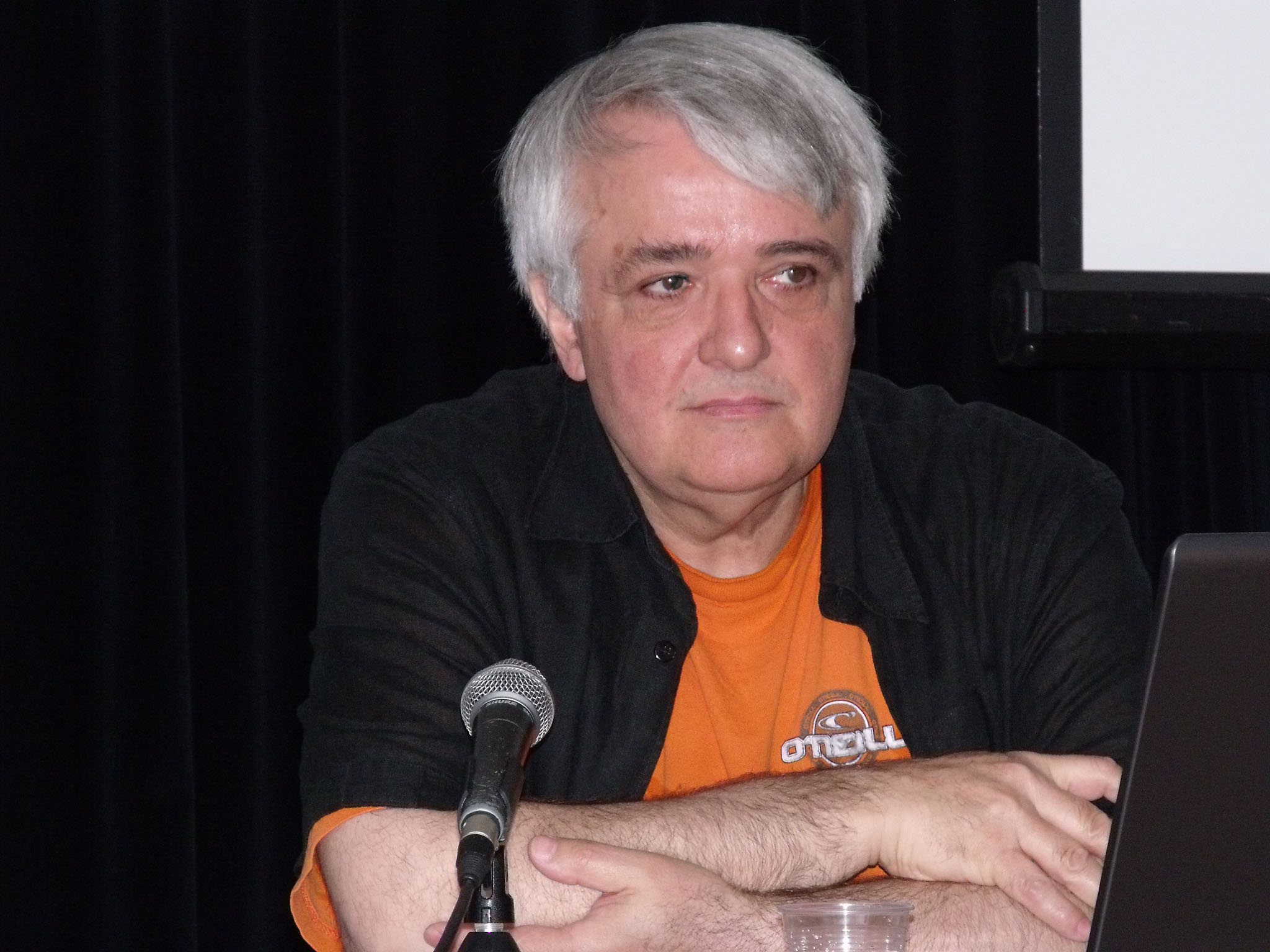
- Born: Vojislav Antonić; 12 July 1952 (age 73); Šabac, Serbia (then Yugoslavia)
- Other names: Voja
- Known for: Design of Galaksija home computer
- Website: www.voja.rs

Vojislav "Voja" Antonić (Serbian Cyrillic: Воја Антонић, pronounced [ˈʋɔja ˈantɔnitɕ]ʾ, 12 July 1952) is a Serbian inventor, journalist, and writer. He is known for creating a build-it-yourself home computer Galaksija and originating a related "Build your own computer Galaksija" initiative with Dejan Ristanović. This initiative encouraged and enlightened thousands of computer enthusiasts during the 1980s in the Socialist Federal Republic of Yugoslavia. Antonić has donated many of his personal creations to the public domain. He was also a magazine editor and contributed to a number of radio shows.

== Biography ==
While in school, Voja Antonić found a passion for HAM radios. He obtained a licence and a callsign to broadcast his own waves. One day, the state police seized all CB Band units known to operate in the country, creating a new trend for HAM radio units which bored Voja Antonić who decided to move on towards new digital technologies.

His first creation with a microprocessor was Conway's Game of Life machine which shows its state using 16x16 matrix of red LEDs. Without a computer, Voja Antonić wrote the code on paper and operated the input in the system byte by byte using rotary switches. LEDs being expensive back then, it took him months to buy and install the last LEDs. A replica of his machine reportedly worked flawlessly almost continuously for 40 years.

When personal computers arrived on the market, they were not accessible in Yugoslavia. Voja Antonić asked a friend in the USA to disassemble a TRS-80 Model I and send it to him and received it labelled as "technical junk". He received it, reassembled it, and started his new computer passion.

While studying at the Faculty of Dramatic Arts in the late 1970s, he started to build computer systems capable of rendering animations.

Prior to the Winter of 1981/1982, the Skiing Federation of Serbia timed the competitors using regular stopwatches and hand signaling. The upcoming Balkan competition required this to be improved and more precise. In 1981, Antonić created a small, battery powered computer packed together with liquid crystal display, printer and keyboard in Samsonite suitcases. Over the years five different models were built, named from "Arbitar" to "Arbitar 5", and were used for many years. In 1982, he designed an alarm system for Elektronika inženjering.

While on holiday in Risan, Montenegro in 1983, Antonić learned of the interesting way to have the CPU generate video signal, using an Zilog Z80A microprocessor instead of the more expensive traditional graphics card. When he returned home, he tested the idea; the result was a cheaper build-it-yourself computer with a more simplified design. Near the same time that Antonić made his discovery, Dejan Ristanović, a computer programmer and journalist was entrusted with preparing a special edition of the Galaksija magazine that would be focused on home computers. Antonić initially thought about publishing his information in the popular SAM magazine in Zagreb but after becoming acquainted with Ristanović, the two collaborated and published the Galaksija computer's diagram in a special issue entitled Računari u vašoj kući (Computers in your home). Antonić and Ristanović guesstimated that around a thousand people would try to build the computer by themselves, given that the magazine's circulation was 30,000. Some 8,000 people wound up ordering the build-it-yourself kits from Antonić. Antonić essentially released Galaksija to public domain and never required any compensation for it. He wanted it to be a project anyone can undertake and received only the compensation for writing the magazine article itself, not the computer.

In 1983, his friend Zoran Modli launched a new section on his national radio show focused on microcomputers. Since data coding was performed in audio range (to fit the format of compact cassettes), Voja Antonić and his radio host friend started using the radio waves to transfer computer-generated data, their own online wireless technology of the predigital age.

In 1991, when war broke out in Yugoslavia, Voja Antonić was taken to a remote quarter to be checked by the military. Confessing he was a computer engineer, he was asked to repair an old Apple II, which he did in a day. This earned him the favors of the military forces. During this period, he joined several anti-war and anti-Milošević campaigns, writing articles against terror.

In 1995, while going through a difficult time in his life, he threw away almost all of his projects, including the documentation and five prototypes of the Galaksija microcomputer, as interest in Galaksija waned.

In 1999, Voja Antonić created a logic analyzer, probe, serial interface receiver and frequency counter device based on Microchip Technology PIC16F84 microcontroller. It eventually became Microchip's Application Note 689 (AN689) but was subsequently removed. Microchip explained that Yugoslavia was facing an embargo from the USA, making it impossible to promote his technology worldwide. Although the work was published, the only compensation asked by Voja Antonić, a Microchip in-circuit emulator MPLAB-ICE 1000, was never sent to Antonić.

In 2006, Microchip restored the Application Note 689 and delivered a In-Circuit Debuggers to Voja Antonić.

He donated a copy of the Galaksija to the Muzej Nauke i Tehnike (Museum of Science and Technology) in Belgrade.

Antonić currently resides in Pasadena, California.

== Publications ==
Print books

- Do Nonexistent Things Exist: A Guide to Critical Thinking ("Da li postoje stvari koje ne postoje – vodič za kritičko razmišljanje") ISBN 86-902159-1-3
- Non-Prophecy from Kremna: A Study of Deception ("Kremansko neproročanstvo: studija jedne obmane") ISBN 86-902159-2-1
- Madman's house ("Ludakova Kuća") ISBN 978-86-6024-082-0

Online books

- Patents that Won't Change the World ("Patenti koji neće izmeniti svet", only available in Serbian, free online)

Short stories

Voja Antonić wrote a number of short stories for his appearances in "Modulacije" (eng. Modulations) radio show hosted by Zoran Modli. He personally read them during live public broadcasts.
