= Thailand at the International Science Olympiads =

Thailand first participated at the International Science Olympiad (ISO)—a group of academic competitions for secondary school students—in 1989, when it sent representatives to compete in the International Mathematical Olympiad in Germany. Since then, it has expanded to send representatives to every branch of the annual competition.

Selection as the country's representatives for the ISO is highly competitive, and involves multiple steps of examinations and academic training camps organised by the Institute for the Promotion of Teaching Science and Technology (IPST) and the Promotion of Academic Olympiads and Development of Science Education Foundation (POSN). Country representatives are awarded international scholarships for undergraduate and graduate studies in their fields.

In addition to the International Mathematical Olympiad, Thailand first sent representatives to the International Physics Olympiad and International Chemistry Olympiad in 1990, the International Olympiad in Informatics and International Biology Olympiad in 1991, the International Astronomy Olympiad and International Junior Science Olympiad, and the International Geography Olympiad in 2015. Thailand will first send representatives to the International Philosophy Olympiad in 2018.

== Hosted Olympiad ==
Olympiads	Host city
1995 International Biology Olympiad	Bangkok
1999 International Chemistry Olympiad	Bangkok
2007 International Olympiad on Astronomy and Astrophysics	Chiang Mai
2011 International Physics Olympiad	Bangkok
2011 International Olympiad in Informatics	Pattaya
2015 International Mathematical Olympiad	Chiang Mai
2017 International Chemistry Olympiad	Nakhon Pathom
2017 International Olympiad on Astronomy and Astrophysics	Phuket
2018 International Earth Science Olympiad	Kanchanaburi
2023 International Junior Science Olympiad	Bangkok

== Summary ==
=== Main ===
#	Olympiads	Gold	Silver	Bronze	Total	Ref
1	International Mathematical Olympiad	31	64	52	147	
2	International Physics Olympiad	37	50	18	105	
3	International Chemistry Olympiad	26	68	27	121	
4	International Olympiad in Informatics	15	36	65	116	
5	International Biology Olympiad	43	53	28	129	
6	International Philosophy Olympiad	0	0	1	1	
7	International Astronomy Olympiad	6	18	14	38	
8	International Geography Olympiad	3	2	13	18	
9	International Linguistics Olympiad	0	1	1	2	
11	International Olympiad on Astronomy and Astrophysics	13	19	26	58	
12	International Earth Science Olympiad	6	23	16	45	
Total		180	334	261	780	

=== Others ===
#	Olympiads	Gold	Silver	Bronze	Total	Ref
10	International Junior Science Olympiad	44	65	5	114	
Total		44	65	5	114	

== Medal tables ==
=== International Mathematical Olympiad (IMO) ===
Olympiads	Gold	Silver	Bronze	Honours	Total	Rank
(Romania) Braşov 1959	Did not participate					
(Romania) Sinaia 1960	Did not participate					
(Hungary) Veszprém 1961	Did not participate					
(Czechoslovakia) České Budějovice 1962	Did not participate					
(Poland) Wrocław 1963	Did not participate					
(Soviet Union) Moscow 1964	Did not participate					
(East Germany) Berlin 1965	Did not participate					
(Bulgaria) Sofia 1966	Did not participate					
(Socialist Federal Republic of Yugoslavia) Cetinje 1967	Did not participate					
(Soviet Union) Moscow 1968	Did not participate					
(Romania) Bucharest 1969	Did not participate					
(Hungary) Keszthely 1970	Did not participate					
(Czechoslovakia) Žilina 1971	Did not participate					
(Poland) Toruń 1972	Did not participate					
(Soviet Union) Moscow 1973	Did not participate					
(East Germany) Erfurt 1974	Did not participate					
(Bulgaria) Burgas 1975	Did not participate					
(Austria) Lienz 1976	Did not participate					
(Socialist Federal Republic of Yugoslavia) Belgrade 1977	Did not participate					
(Romania) Bucharest 1978	Did not participate					
(United Kingdom) London 1979	Did not participate					
(United States) Washington 1981	Did not participate					
(Hungary) Budapest 1982	Did not participate					
(France) Paris 1983	Did not participate					
(Czechoslovakia) Prague 1984	Did not participate					
(Finland) Joutsa 1985	Did not participate					
(Poland) Warsaw 1986	Did not participate					
(Cuba) Havanna 1987	Did not participate					
(Australia) Canberra 1988	Did not participate					
(West Germany) Braunschweig 1989	0	0	1	2	3	–
(China) Beijing 1990	0	0	2	2	4	–
(Sweden) Sigtuna 1991	0	1	1	3	5	–
(Russia) Moscow 1992	0	1	0	0	1	–
(Turkey) Istanbul 1993	0	0	2	0	2	–
Hong Kong 1994	0	0	3	1	4	–
(Canada) Toronto 1995	0	1	2	1	4	–
(India) Mumbai 1996	0	0	1	2	3	–
(Argentina) Mar del Plata 1997	0	0	1	4	5	–
(Taiwan) Taipei 1998	0	0	2	1	3	–
(Romania) Bucharest 1999	0	0	3	0	3	–
(South Korea) Daejeon 2000	0	1	3	0	4	–
(United States) Washington 2001	0	2	2	0	4	–
(United Kingdom) Glasgow 2002	0	2	2	2	6	–
(Japan) Tokyo 2003	1	1	3	1	6	–
(Greece) Athens 2004	0	0	4	2	6	–
(Mexico) Mérida 2005	0	4	2	0	6	–
(Slovenia) Ljubljana 2006	1	3	2	0	6	–
(Vietnam) Hanoi 2007	1	3	2	0	6	–
(Spain) Madrid 2008	2	3	1	0	6	–
(Germany) Bremen 2009	1	5	0	0	6	–
(Kazakhstan) Astana 2010	1	5	0	0	6	–
(Netherlands) Amsterdam 2011	3	2	1	0	6	–
(Argentina) Mar del Plata 2012	3	3	0	0	6	–
(Colombia) Santa Marta 2013	1	4	1	0	6	–
(South Africa) Cape Town 2014	0	4	2	0	6	–
(Thailand) Chiang Mai 2015	2	3	1	0	6	–
Hong Kong 2016	2	2	1	1	6	–
(Brazil) Rio de Janeiro 2017	3	0	2	1	6	–
(Romania) Cluj-Napoca 2018	3	3	0	0	6	–
(United Kingdom) Bath 2019	3	3	0	0	6	–
(Russia) Saint Petersburg 2020	2	3	1	0	6	–
(Russia) S aint Petersburg 2021	1	3	2	0	6	–
(Norway) Oslo 2022	3	2	1	0	6	–
(Japan) Chiba 2023	1	3	1	1	6	–
Total	31	64	52	24	171	–

=== International Physics Olympiad (IPhO) ===
Olympiads	Gold	Silver	Bronze	Honours	Total	Rank
(Poland) Warsaw 1967	Did not participate					
(Hungary) Budapest 1968	Did not participate					
(Czechoslovakia) Brno 1969	Did not participate					
(Soviet Union) Moscow 1970	Did not participate					
(Bulgaria) Sofia 1971	Did not participate					
(Romania) Bucharest 1972	Did not participate					
(Poland) Warsaw 1974	Did not participate					
(East Germany) Güstrow 1975	Did not participate					
(Hungary) Budapest 1976	Did not participate					
(Czechoslovakia) Hradec Králové 1977	Did not participate					
(Soviet Union) Moscow 1979	Did not participate					
(Bulgaria) Varna 1981	Did not participate					
(West Germany) Malente 1982	Did not participate					
(Romania) Bucharest 1983	Did not participate					
(Sweden) Sigtuna 1984	Did not participate					
(Socialist Federal Republic of Yugoslavia) Portorož 1985	Did not participate					
(United Kingdom) London 1986	Did not participate					
(East Germany) Jena 1987	Did not participate					
(Austria) Bad Ischl 1988	Did not participate					
(Poland) Warsaw 1989	Did not participate					
(Netherlands) Groningen 1990	0	0	0	0	0	−
(Cuba) Havana 1991	0	0	1	0	1	–
(Finland) Helsinki 1992	0	0	1	0	1	–
(United States) Williamsburg 1993	0	0	0	1	1	–
(China) Beijing 1994	0	0	0	0	0	−
(Australia) Canberra 1995	0	0	0	0	0	−
(Norway) Oslo 1996	0	0	0	2	2	–
(Canada) Sudbury 1997	0	0	0	3	3	–
(Iceland) Reykjavík 1998	0	0	0	1	1	–
(Italy) Padova 1999	0	0	1	2	3	–
(United Kingdom) Leicester 2000	0	0	0	1	1	–
(Turkey) Antalya 2001	0	0	1	3	4	–
(Indonesia) Bali 2002	1	2	1	1	5	–
(Taiwan) Taipei 2003	1	1	0	3	5	–
(South Korea) Pohang 2004	1	1	3	0	5	–
(Spain) Salamanca 2005	2	2	1	0	5	–
Singapore 2006	1	4	0	0	5	–
(Iran) Isfahan 2007	1	2	2	0	5	–
(Vietnam) Hanoi 2008	3	2	0	0	5	–
(Mexico) Mérida 2009	1	4	0	0	5	–
(Croatia) Zagreb 2010	5	0	0	0	5	–
(Thailand) Bangkok 2011	3	1	1	0	5	–
(Estonia) Tallinn/Tartu 2012	3	1	1	0	5	–
(Denmark) Copenhagen 2013	3	2	0	0	5	–
(Kazakhstan) Astana 2014	4	1	0	0	5	–
(India) Mumbai 2015	1	4	0	0	5	–
(Switzerland) / (Liechtenstein) Zürich 2016	2	3	0	0	5	–
(Indonesia) Yogyakarta 2017	2	3	0	0	5	–
(Portugal) Lisbon 2018	1	4	0	0	5	–
(Israel) Jerusalem 2019	1	3	1	0	5	–
(Lithuania) Vilnius 2021	0	3	2	0	5	–
Switzerland 2022	0	5	0	0	5	–
(Japan) Tokyo 2023	1	2	2	0	5	–
Total	37	50	18	17	122	–

=== International Chemistry Olympiad (IChO) ===
Olympiads	Gold	Silver	Bronze	Honours	Total	Rank
(Czechoslovakia) Prague 1968	Did not participate					
(Poland) Katowice 1969	Did not participate					
(Hungary) Budapest 1970	Did not participate					
(Soviet Union) Moscow 1972	Did not participate					
(Bulgaria) Sofia 1973	Did not participate					
(Romania) Bucharest 1974	Did not participate					
(Hungary) Veszprém 1975	Did not participate					
(East Germany) Halle 1976	Did not participate					
(Czechoslovakia) Bratislava 1977	Did not participate					
(Poland) Toruń 1978	Did not participate					
(Soviet Union) Leningrad 1979	Did not participate					
(Austria) Linz 1980	Did not participate					
(Bulgaria) Burgas 1981	Did not participate					
(Sweden) Stockholm 1982	Did not participate					
(Romania) Timişoara 1983	Did not participate					
(West Germany) Frankfurt 1984	Did not participate					
(Czechoslovakia) Bratislava 1985	Did not participate					
(Netherlands) Leiden 1986	Did not participate					
(Hungary) Veszprém 1987	Did not participate					
(Finland) Espoo 1988	Did not participate					
(East Germany) Halle 1989	Did not participate					
(France) Paris 1990	0	0	1	0	1	–
(Poland) Łódź 1991	0	0	2	0	2	–
(United States) Pittsburgh/ Washington 1992	0	0	3	0	3	–
(Italy) Perugia 1993	0	0	2	1	3	–
(Norway) Oslo 1994	0	1	3	0	4	–
(China) Beijing 1995	0	1	2	0	3	–
(Russia) Moscow 1996	0	1	1	0	2	–
(Canada) Montreal 1997	0	2	1	1	4	–
(Australia) Melbourne 1998	0	1	2	1	4	–
(Thailand) Bangkok 1999	0	3	1	0	4	–
(Denmark) Copenhagen 2000	0	2	2	0	4	–
(India) Mumbai 2001	1	2	1	0	4	–
(Netherlands) Groningen 2002	3	1	0	0	4	–
(Greece) Athens 2003	3	1	0	0	4	–
(Germany) Kiel 2004	0	2	2	0	4	–
(Taiwan) Taipei 2005	1	3	0	0	4	–
(South Korea) Gyeongsan 2006	1	2	1	0	4	–
(Russia) Moscow 2007	1	3	0	0	4	–
(Hungary) Budapest 2008	1	3	0	0	4	–
(United Kingdom) Cambridge 2009	0	4	0	0	4	–
(Japan) Tokyo 2010	3	1	0	0	4	–
(Turkey) Ankara 2011	2	2	0	0	4	–
(United States) Washington 2012	1	1	1	0	3	–
(Russia) Moscow 2013	1	3	0	0	4	–
(Vietnam) Hanoi 2014	1	3	0	0	4	–
(Azerbaijan) Baku 2015	1	3	0	0	4	–
(Georgia (country)) Tbilisi 2016	1	2	0	0	3	–
(Thailand) Nakhon Pathom 2017	2	2	0	0	4	–
(Czech Republic) Prague 2018/ (Slovakia) Bratislava 2018	1	3	0	0	4	–
(France) Paris 2019	1	3	0	0	4	–
(Turkey) Istanbul 2020	0	4	0	0	4	–
(Japan) Osaka 2021	0	3	1	0	4	–
(China) Tianjin 2022	0	4	0	0	4	–
(Switzerland) Zürich 2023	1	2	1	0	4	–
Total	26	68	27	3	124	–

=== International Olympiad in Informatics (IOI) ===
Olympiads	Gold	Silver	Bronze	Honours	Total	Rank
(Bulgaria) Pravetz 1989	Did not participate					
(Soviet Union) Minsk 1990	Did not participate					
(Greece) Athens 1991	0	1	2	0	3	–
(Germany) Bonn 1992	2	1	1	0	4	–
(Argentina) Mendoza 1993	0	2	1	0	3	–
(Sweden) Haninge 1994	0	0	2	0	2	–
(Netherlands) Eindhoven 1995	0	0	2	0	2	–
(Hungary) Veszprém 1996	0	2	1	0	3	–
(South Africa) Cape Town 1997	0	1	3	0	4	–
(Portugal) Setúbal 1998	0	1	2	0	3	–
(Turkey) Antalya 1999	1	0	2	0	3	–
(China) Beijing 2000	0	3	1	0	4	–
(Finland) Tampere 2001	0	1	3	0	4	–
(South Korea) Yongin 2002	0	0	3	0	3	–
(United States) Kenosha 2003	0	3	1	0	4	–
(Greece) Athens 2004	1	1	2	0	4	–
(Poland) Nowy Sącz 2005	2	2	0	0	4	–
(Mexico) Mérida 2006	0	0	3	0	3	–
(Croatia) Zagreb 2007	1	3	0	0	4	–
(Egypt) Cairo 2008	2	1	1	0	4	–
(Bulgaria) Plovdiv 2009	1	2	1	0	4	–
(Canada) Waterloo 2010	1	2	1	0	4	–
(Thailand) Pattaya 2011	2	1	1	0	4	–
(Italy) Sirmione/ Montichiari 2012	0	0	4	0	4	–
(Australia) Brisbane 2013	0	1	2	0	3	–
(Taiwan) Taipei 2014	2	0	2	0	4	–
(Kazakhstan) Almaty 2015	0	4	0	0	4	–
(Russia) Kazan 2016	0	1	3	0	4	–
(Iran) Tehran 2017	0	1	3	0	4	–
(Japan) Tsukuba 2018	0	1	3	0	4	–
(Azerbaijan) Baku 2019	0	1	2	0	3	–
Singapore 2020	0	0	4	0	4	–
Singapore 2021	0	0	1	0	1	–
(Indonesia) Yogyakarta 2022	0	0	1	1	2	–
(Hungary) Szeged 2023	0	0	2	0	2	–
Total	15	36	65	1	117	–

=== International Biology Olympiad (IBO) ===
Olympiads	Gold	Silver	Bronze	Honours	Total	Rank
(Czechoslovakia) Olomouc 1990	Did not participate					
(Soviet Union) Makhachkala 1991	0	1	3	0	4	–
(Czechoslovakia) Poprad 1992	1	2	1	0	4	–
(Netherlands) Utrecht 1993	0	0	3	0	3	–
(Bulgaria) Varna 1994	0	0	2	0	2	–
(Thailand) Bangkok 1995	3	1	0	0	4	–
(Ukraine) Artek 1996	0	0	4	0	4	–
(Turkmenistan) Ashgabat 1997	0	3	1	0	4	–
(Germany) Kiel 1998	1	3	0	0	4	–
(Sweden) Uppsala 1999	1	0	3	0	4	–
(Turkey) Antalya 2000	0	3	1	0	4	–
(Belgium) Brussels 2001	2	1	1	0	4	–
(Latvia) Jūrmala/Riga 2002	1	3	0	0	4	–
(Belarus) Minsk 2003	3	1	0	0	4	–
(Australia) Brisbane 2004	1	3	0	0	4	–
(China) Beijing 2005	3	1	0	0	4	–
(Argentina) Río Cuarto 2006	3	1	0	0	4	–
(Canada) Saskatoon 2007	2	2	0	0	4	–
(India) Mumbai 2008	3	1	0	0	4	–
(Japan) Tsukuba 2009	1	3	0	0	4	–
(South Korea) Changwon 2010	3	1	0	0	4	–
(Taiwan) Taipei 2011	2	2	0	0	4	–
Singapore 2012	2	1	1	0	4	–
(Switzerland) Bern 2013	2	2	0	0	4	–
(Indonesia) Bali 2014	2	2	0	0	4	–
(Denmark) Aarhus 2015	1	3	0	0	4	–
(Vietnam) Hanoi 2016	1	2	1	0	4	–
(United Kingdom) Coventry 2017	0	1	3	0	4	–
(Iran) Tehran 2018	0	4	0	0	4	–
(Hungary) Szeged 2019	1	2	1	0	4	–
(Japan) Nagasaki 2020	1	0	3	0	4	–
(Portugal) Lisbon 2021	1	3	0	0	4	–
(Armenia) Yerevan 2022	2	2	0	0	4	–
(United Arab Emirates) Al Ain 2023	0	4	0	0	4	–
Total	43	58	28	0	129	–

*IBO 2020 Special Award: The 3D Reconstruction Award (Practical 1: Animal Physiology)

=== International Philosophy Olympiad (IPO) ===
Olympiads	Gold	Silver	Bronze	Honours	Total	Rank
(Bulgaria) Smolyan 1993	Did not participate					
(Bulgaria) Petrich 1994	Did not participate					
(Bulgaria) Stara Zagora 1995	Did not participate					
(Turkey) Istanbul 1996	Did not participate					
(Poland) Warsaw 1997	Did not participate					
(Romania) Braşov 1998	Did not participate					
(Hungary) Budapest 1999	Did not participate					
(Germany) Münster 2000	Did not participate					
(United States) Philadelphia 2001	Did not participate					
(Japan) Tokyo 2002	Did not participate					
(Argentina) Buenos Aires 2003	Did not participate					
(South Korea) Seoul 2004	Did not participate					
(Poland) Warsaw 2005	Did not participate					
(Italy) Cosenza 2006	Did not participate					
(Turkey) Antalya 2007	Did not participate					
(Romania) Iaşi 2008	Did not participate					
(Finland) Helsinki 2009	Did not participate					
(Greece) Athens 2010	Did not participate					
(Austria) Vienna 2011	Did not participate					
(Norway) Oslo 2012	Did not participate					
(Denmark) Odense 2013	Did not participate					
(Lithuania) Vilnius 2014	Did not participate					
(Estonia) Tartu 2015	Did not participate					
(Belgium) Ghent 2016	Did not participate					
(Netherlands) Rotterdam 2017	Did not participate					
(Montenegro) Bar 2018	0	0	0	1	1	–
(Italy) Rome 2019	0	0	0	0	0	–
(Portugal) Lisbon 2022	0	0	1	1	2	-
Total	0	0	1	2	3	–

=== International Astronomy Olympiad (IAO) ===
Olympiads	Gold	Silver	Bronze	Total	Rank
(Russia) Arkhyz 1996	Did not participate				
(Russia) Arkhyz 1997	Did not participate				
(Russia) Arkhyz 1998	Did not participate				
(Autonomous Republic of Crimea) Nauchnyj 1999	Did not participate				
(Russia) Arkhyz 2000	Did not participate				
(Autonomous Republic of Crimea) Nauchnyj 2001	Did not participate				
(Russia) Arkhyz 2002	Did not participate				
(Sweden) Stockholm 2003	Did not participate				
(Autonomous Republic of Crimea) Simeiz 2004	0	1	0	1	–
(China) Beijing 2005	0	0	1	1	–
(India) Mumbai 2006	0	1	2	3	–
(Autonomous Republic of Crimea) Simeiz 2007	0	0	1	1	–
(Italy) Trieste 2008	0	1	1	2	–
(China) Hangzhou 2009	0	0	0	0	−
(Autonomous Republic of Crimea) Sudak 2010	1	2	0	3	–
(Kazakhstan) Almaty 2011	0	2	1	3	–
(South Korea) Gwangju 2012	0	1	2	3	–
(Lithuania) Vilnius 2013	0	2	1	3	–
(Kyrgyzstan) Bishkek/ Cholpon-Ata 2014	1	2	0	3	–
(Russia) Kazan 2015	1	1	1	3	–
(Bulgaria) Smolyan/ Pamporovo 2016	0	2	1	3	–
(China) Weihai 2017	0	1	2	3	–
(Sri Lanka) Colmbo 2018	2	1	0	3	–
(Romania) Piatra Niemt 2019	1	1	1	3	
Total	6	18	14	38	–

=== International Geography Olympiad (IGeO) ===
Olympiads	Gold	Silver	Bronze	Honours	Total	Rank
(Netherlands) The Hague 1996	Did not participate					
(Portugal) Lisbon 1998	Did not participate					
(South Korea) Seoul 2000	Did not participate					
(South Africa) Durban 2002	Did not participate					
(Poland) Gdańsk 2004	Did not participate					
(Australia) Brisbane 2006	Did not participate					
(Tunisia) Carthage 2008	Did not participate					
(Taiwan) Taipei 2010	Did not participate					
(Germany) Cologne 2012	Did not participate					
(Japan) Kyoto 2013	Did not participate					
(Poland) Kraków 2014	Did not participate					
(Russia) Tver 2015	0	1	3	0	4	–
(China) Beijing 2016	2	1	1	0	4	–
(Serbia) Belgrade 2017	1	0	2	0	3	–
(Canada) Quebec City 2018	0	0	4	0	4	–
Hong Kong 2019	0	0	3	0	3	–
Total	3	2	13	0	18	–

=== International Linguistics Olympiad (IOL) ===
Olympiads	Gold	Silver	Bronze	Honours	Total	Rank
(Bulgaria) Borovets 2003	Did not participate					
(Russia) Moscow 2004	Did not participate					
(Netherlands) Leiden 2005	Did not participate					
(Estonia) Tartu 2006	Did not participate					
(Russia) Saint Petersburg 2007	Did not participate					
(Bulgaria) Sunny Beach 2008	Did not participate					
(Poland) Wrocław 2009	Did not participate					
(Sweden) Stockholm 2010	Did not participate					
(United States) Pittsburgh 2011	Did not participate					
(Slovenia) Ljubljana 2012	Did not participate					
(United Kingdom) Manchester 2013	Did not participate					
(China) Beijing 2014	Did not participate					
(Bulgaria) Blagoevgrad 2015	Did not participate					
(India) Mysore 2016	Did not participate					
(Republic of Ireland) Dublin 2017	Did not participate					
(Czech Republic) Prague 2018	Did not participate					
(South Korea) Yongin 2019	Did not participate					
(Latvia) Ventspils 2021	Did not participate					
(Isle of Man) Castletown 2022	0	0	1	1	2	–
(Bulgaria) Bansko 2023	0	1	0	1	2	–
Total	0	1	1	2	4	–

=== International Junior Science Olympiad (IJSO) ===
Olympiads	Gold	Silver	Bronze	Honours	Total	Rank
(Indonesia) Jakarta 2004	2	4	0	0	6	–
(Indonesia) Yogyakarta 2005	0	6	0	0	6	–
(Brazil) São Paulo 2006	1	5	0	0	6	–
(Taiwan) Taipei 2007	0	3	3	0	6	–
(South Korea) Gyeongsangnam-do 2008	2	4	0	0	6	–
(Azerbaijan) Baku 2009	3	3	0	0	6	–
(Nigeria) Abuja 2010	2	4	0	0	6	–
(South Africa) Durban 2011	3	3	0	0	6	–
(Iran) Teheran 2012	2	3	1	0	6	–
(India) Mumbai 2013	5	1	0	0	6	–
(Argentina) Mendoza 2014	5	1	0	0	6	–
(South Korea) Daegu 2015	2	4	0	0	6	–
(Indonesia) Bali 2016	1	5	0	0	6	–
(Netherlands) Arnhem/Nijmegen 2017	1	5	0	0	6	–
(Botswana) Gaborone 2018	4	2	0	0	6	–
(Qatar) Doha 2019	4	2	0	0	6	–
(Germany) Frankfurt 2020	Cancelled due to COVID-19					
(United Arab Emirates) Dubai 2021	2	4	0	0	6	–
(Colombia) Bogota 2022	1	4	1	0	6	–
(Thailand) Bangkok 2023	4	2	0	0	6	–
Total	44	65	5	0	114	–

=== International Olympiad on Astronomy and Astrophysics (IOAA) ===
Olympiads	Gold	Silver	Bronze	Honours	Total	Rank
(Thailand) Chiang Mai 2007	3	2	0	0	5	–
(Indonesia) Bandung 2008	1	0	1	3	5	–
(Iran) Tehran 2009	1	1	2	1	5	–
(China) Beijing 2010	2	1	2	0	5	–
(Poland) Katowice/Chorzów/ Kraków 2011	0	1	3	1	5	–
(Brazil) Rio de Janeiro 2012	1	0	3	1	5	–
(Greece) Volos 2013	2	2	1	0	5	–
(Romania) Suceava/ Gura Humorului 2014	0	2	3	0	5	–
(Indonesia) Magelang 2015	1	0	3	1	5	–
(India) Bhubaneswar 2016	0	2	3	0	5	–
(Thailand) Phuket 2017	2	2	1	0	5	–
(China) Beijing 2018	0	3	2	0	5	–
(Hungary) Keszthely 2019	0	3	2	0	5	–
Total	13	19	26	7	65	–

=== International Earth Science Olympiad (IESO) ===
Olympiads	Gold	Silver	Bronze	Honours	Total	Rank
(South Korea) Yeongwol 2007	Did not participate					
(Philippines) Manila 2008	Did not participate					
(Taiwan) Taipei 2009	0	1	2	0	3	–
(Indonesia) Yogyakarta 2010	0	3	1	0	4	–
(Italy) Modena 2011	1	3	0	0	4	–
(Argentina) Buenos Aires 2012	0	2	2	0	4	–
(India) Mysore 2013	1	3	0	0	4	–
(Spain) Santander 2014	2	2	0	0	4	–
(Brazil) Minas Gerais 2015	1	1	2	0	4	–
(Japan) Mie 2016	0	0	3	0	3	–
(France) French Riviera 2017	0	2	2	0	4	–
(Thailand) Kanchanaburi 2018	0	2	2	0	4	–
(South Korea) Daegu 2019	0	2	1	0	3	–
(Russia) Tyumen 2021	1	2	1	0	4	–
Total	6	23	16	0	45	–

== See also ==
- Thailand at the Olympics
- Thailand at the Youth Olympics
- Thailand at the Paralympics
