= Arthur C. Clarke Institute for Modern Technologies =

Sri Lankan research institute

- Logo of the Arthur C. Clarke Institute for Modern Technologies
- Abbreviation: ACCIMT
- Formation: 1984
- Type: Governmental institution
- Headquarters: Moratuwa, Sri Lanka
- Region served: Sri Lanka
- Members: Asia Pacific Regional Space Agency Forum (APRSAF)
- Chairman: Professor K. P. S. Chandana Jayaratne
- Parent organization: Ministry of Science, Technology and Research
- Website: Official website

Arthur C. Clarke Institute for Modern Technologies (ACCIMT) (Sinhala: නවීන තාක්ෂණය පිළිබඳ ආතර් සී. ක්ලාක් මධ්‍යස්ථානය Navina Takshanaya Pilibanda Athar Si. Klak Madhyasthanaya) is an institute for research and technology transfer in Sri Lanka. It is named after its founder patron, Sir Arthur C. Clarke, the famous British science fiction author, inventor and futurist. The institute is mainly focused on conducting research in the fields of electronics, micro-electronics, telecommunications, information technology, space technologies and robotics, and providing training for relevant industry professionals. It is one of the few institutions of this kind in Sri Lanka.

== History ==
The ACCIMT was established in 1984 by act of parliament, the Arthur C. Clarke Centre for Modern Technologies Act, No. 30 of 1984. This institution, initially known as Arthur C. Clarke Centre, was renamed as the Arthur C. Clarke Institute for Modern Technologies, and re-established in a corporate form in 1994 by the Science And Technology Development Act, No. 11 of 1994. It comes under the purview of the Ministry of Science, Technology and Research, Sri Lanka. In the same year, the ACCIMT was appointed as the national focal point for space technology applications, by the United Nations Economic and Social Commission for Asia and the Pacific (UNESCAP).

In 1996, the institute received a 45 cm GoTo Cassegrain reflector telescope as a donation by the Tokyo National Observatory via the Government of Japan. It is the largest optical telescope in Sri Lanka. Relevant technical assistance was provided by Besei Astronomical Observatory, Japan and the South African Astronomical Observatory.

ACCIMT received the membership of Asia Pacific Regional Space Agency Forum (APRSAF) sponsored by Japan Aerospace Exploration Agency (JAXA), as a result of activities carried out to popularize astronomy among the Sri Lankan community. ACCIMT hosted the 15th Session of the Intergovernmental Consultative Committee on the Regional Space Applications Programme for Sustainable Development (RESAP) in 2011. The program was conducted by the UNESCAP.

== Services ==
=== Research and development ===
The institute conducts research in information and communications technology, electronics, microelectronics, space technology, Astronomy and robotics. Most of its research is aimed at promoting latest technology among government and the private sector industries in Sri Lanka.

=== Consultancy ===
The institute also provides industry-wide services for microprocessor based machinery, telecommunications systems, information systems and computer networks. In addition, diagnostic and calibration services are provided for sophisticated instrumentation, by its instrumentation division.

=== Training programs ===
ACCIMT conducts Continuing Professional Development programs for professionals and senior managers serving in local industries. It has also launched electronics workshops and astronomy outreach programs for school students in Sri Lanka. Library facilities are available for university students and the general public. Moreover, students selected for the International Olympiad on Astronomy and Astrophysics through the Sri Lankan Astronomy and Astrophysics Olympiad are also trained at ACCIMT.

=== National Hub for Receiving and Redistribution Satellite Data for Earth Observation ===
The ACCIMT has negotiated with foreign agencies to receive the satellite data free of charge or at an affordable cost which will be stored in a server located at the ACCIMT and will be shared with the public sector organizations who use satellite data for national development. Infrastructure to receive and distribute Earth observation data and a ten-acre site for the proposed National Space Hub is identified in the Megapolis Master Plan for Western Province. The Satellite Ground Station will be installed at Mahenwatta in Pitipana, Homagama at the geographical location 6°49′ 38.48″N, 80° 2′ 8.20″E

== Arthur C. Clarke memorial lecture ==
Since the death of Sir Arthur C. Clarke in 2008, the institute conducts an annual Arthur C. Clarke Memorial Lecture. The lecture is delivered by a prominent scientist in the field of space science.

Scientists who have delivered the lecture include:

- 2009 - Dr. Krishnaswamy Kasturirangan (former chairman of the Indian Space Research Organization and member of the Planning Commission of India)
- 2010 - Dr. Thirumalachari Ramasami (secretary to the Department of Science and Technology, India)
- 2011 - Dr. Mustafa Din Subari (director general of the Malaysian National Space Agency)
- 2012 - Prof. Suvit Vibulsresth (founder-executive director of the Geo-Informatics and Space Technology Development Agency of Thailand)
- 2013 - Prof.G ehan Amarathunga (professor of Engineering and head of Electronics, Power and Energy Conservation at the University of Cambridge)
- 2014 - Prof. Hui Lin (professor and director of the Institute of Space and Earth Information Science (ISEIS) of the Chinese University of Hong Kong)
- 2015 - Prof. Guo Huadong (director general of Institute of Remote Sensing and Digital Earth (RADI) of the Chinese Academy of Sciences (CAS))
- 2016 - Dr. Sarath Gunapala (physicist and director, Center for Infrared Photo Detectors, NASA Jet Propulsion Laboratory, Pasadena, USA) ("Exploration of Our Solar System and Beyond")

== See also ==
- Arthur C. Clarke
- Research in Sri Lanka
- Institute of Fundamental Studies
