= Sri Lankan Astronomy and Astrophysics Olympiad =

The Sri Lankan Astronomy and Astrophysics Olympiad is a competition for Sri Lankan high school students on Astronomy and Astrophysics. It is the highest and the only government sponsored competition in the field of Astronomy, in Sri Lanka.

== History ==
The Sri Lankan Astronomy and Astrophysics Olympiad competition was initiated in 2007, in order to prepare students for the International Olympiad on Astronomy and Astrophysics. The Institute of Physics Sri Lanka in collaboration with the Department of Physics, University of Colombo and Ministry of Education made arrangements to hold national competitions, related to international events annually. It is coordinated by Prof. K.P.S. Chandana Jayaratne of the University of Colombo. 13 Sri Lankan Astronomy and Astrophysics Olympiads and 9 Sri Lankan Junior Astronomy Olympiads have been held as of September 7, 2019.

== Nature of the competition ==
The preliminary round of the Sri Lankan Astronomy and Astrophysics Olympiad competition is a two-hour theory paper on Astronomy and Astrophysics. It usually consists of 20-30 multiple choice questions and five structured essay type questions. The competition is conducted in three languages Sinhala, Tamil and English. There is no age limit for the competition as long as the participant's age does not exceed 19 years to the given date. Main sections that covered are, Basic Astrophysics, Coordinates and Times, Solar System, Stellar Systems, Cosmology, Instrumentation and Space Technologies. Students selected from the competition are trained at the Department of Physics, University of Colombo, Sri Lanka Planetarium and at the Arthur C. Clarke Institute for Modern Technologies, Moratuwa.

== Influence ==
Astronomy gained traction among Sri Lankan high school students by the mid 1990s. There was a rapid increase in the formation of astronomy clubs in Sri Lankan schools at that time. Anandian Astronomical Association, Nalanda College Astronomical Society, Astronomical Society of Dharmaraja College, Astronomical Society of Mahamaya Girls' College are few of the major high school astronomical societies formed during this phase. This led to the inception of various quiz competitions and observation competitions among schools, relative to astronomy. Up until the Olympiad was initiated in 2007, there was no government involvement in the field. The Astronomy and Astrophysics Olympiad competition has since encourage many high school students in Sri Lanka to engage in the study of astronomy and astrophysics.

== Achievements ==
Sri Lankan students have won 1 bronze medal, 11 honorable mentions and 1 prize for the Most Creative Solution in Theory in 11 International Olympiads on Astronomy and Astrophysics so far. The junior Astronomy Olympiad team that selected from Sri Lankan Junior Astronomy Olympiad 2023 consisting of 5 students all over the country had participated to 3rd International Olympiad on Astronomy and Astrophysics junior 2024 that held in Kathmandu valley, Nepal and also had won 5 honourable mention for the first time in a junior competition.

== See also ==
- International Olympiad on Astronomy and Astrophysics
- International Astronomy Olympiad
