= Open International =

Open International may refer to:

- BH Tennis Open International Cup
- Open International de Saint-Raphaël
- Open International de Squash de Nantes
- Open International de Tennis de Roanne
- Open International Féminin de Montpellier
- Open International Geography Olympiad
- Open International University of Human Development "Ukraine"
- Philippines Open International Championships

== See also ==
- International (disambiguation)
- International Open (disambiguation)
- Open (sport)
