= IPST =

IPST may refer to:

- Institute of Paper Science and Technology, a research institute at the Georgia Institute of Technology known now as Renewable Bioproducts Institute (RBI)
- Institute for the Promotion of Teaching Science and Technology, a Thai state agency, founded in 1972
- Israel Program for Scientific Translations
