= International Association of Young Geographers =

- Abbreviation: IAYG
- Predecessor: National Association of Young Geographers (NAYG)
- Legal status: 501(c)(3) organisation
- Website: www.iaygfamily.org

The International Association of Young Geographers (IAYG) is a nonprofit organisation in the field of geographic education. The IAYG serves professors, educators, and university students through programmes and initiatives aimed at young people, students, and early career researchers. In addition to geographic education, the organisation's areas of interest include civic education and youth, peace, and security.

The organisation's goals are to help "young people learn about and engage in the world." The IAYG organises academic competitions, seminars, and lectures, in addition to events for educators. Additionally, in partnership with the International Geographical Union Young & Early Career Geographers Taskforce, it establishes events and offers support to early career researchers.

== Programmes ==
=== Academic Competitions and Events ===
The IAYG and its affiliates organise academic competitions in geography for secondary school students. Each competition is a one-day event, typically held in schools or universities, that challenges local students through a variety of geography, GIS, and spatial thinking explorations. Events like the Philippine Geography Olympiad are qualifying events for the International Geography Olympiad. These events are sometimes organised collaboratively with university departments or with local organisations in geographic education.

Other programmes for students include lectures, civic engagement exercises, geographic education workshops, and Clubs for Peace, through which the IAYG educates young people about international institutions, human rights, and civic engagement.

The IAYG also organises events geared towards teachers and professionals. These include local seminars and conferences. For example, in November 2019, IAYG hosted the first "GIS Day" at the University of Liberia in Monrovia, Liberia.

=== University Students and Young Researchers ===
The IAYG University Society System (IAYG USS) organises university students in affiliated university branches and geography societies. Activities undertaken by university branches include geography awareness events and introductory programmes for matriculating students. Members of affiliated university societies also support programmes for secondary school students.

Furthermore, the IAYG offers research prizes and supports events for young researchers in the fields of geography and environmental sciences. Many of these programmes are conducted in partnership with the International Geographical Union Young & Early Career Geographers Taskforce.

== Governance ==
The IAYG is led by the President and the International Board of Directors, which is composed of the President, Regional Directors, and selected stakeholders. The organisation is further divided into regional branches, headed by Regional Directors, which manage operations across large geographic regions under the auspices of International leadership. Regional branches oversee the work of national branches, headed by a National Coordinator, which work across the country they serve.

== See also ==
- International Geographical Union
- Royal Canadian Geographical Society
- National Geographic Society
- American Geographical Society
- Royal Geographical Society
