= Open world (disambiguation) =

In video games, an open world is a game mechanic of using a virtual world that the player can explore and approach objectives freely.

Open world may also refer to:

- Open world assumption, a knowledge representation assumption in formal logic
- Open World Entertainment, a South Korean independent record label and talent management company
- Open World Forum, an annual event on open source innovation in Paris, France
- Open World Program, ten-day program which brings emerging leaders from Eurasia to the United States to engage with professional counterparts (administered by the Open World Leadership Center)
- Open World Press, a US publisher of role-playing games
- Open World, the working title of the 2019 superhero film Captain Marvel
- Jumanji: Open World, the fifth and final film of Jumanji film series, releasing in 2026

== See also ==
- World Open (disambiguation)
