= European Geography Olympiad =

Annual European geography competition

The logo of the European Geography Olympiad (EGeo)

The European Geography Olympiad (EGeo) is an annual geography competition aimed at secondary school students from European countries.

== Format ==
EGeo is open to students between 12 and 19 years old. Students aged between 12 and 15 years compete in the Junior category while those between 16 and 19 years old take part in the Senior category.

The competition structure follows the structure of the International Geography Olympiad, consisting of 3 parts; Written Response Test (WRT), Fieldwork Exercise (FWE) and Multimedia Test (MMT). The Written Response Test and the Fieldwork Exercise contribute 40% each to the total marks for every participant while the Multimedia Test accounts for the other 20%.

Around 60% of participants from each category receive a medal, with the ratio being roughly 1 Gold : 2 Silver : 3 Bronze.

== History ==
The logo of the Balkan International Geography Olympiad (BiGeo, 2015-2018)

EGeo is the continuation of the competition known as the Balkan International Geography Olympiad (BiGeo), which was first held in 2015 in Belgrade, with three participating countries, Serbia, Slovenia and Romania.

In 2019, the competition was named the Geography Olympiad of Central, Southern & Southeastern Europe (GO), before receiving its current name in 2020.

Map of EGeO participant countries

The logo of the Geography Olympiad of Central, Southern & Southeastern Europe (GO, 2019)

== Summary ==
Edition	Year	Olympiad Name	Host country	Host city	Individual Olympiad Champion (Seniors)	Individual Olympiad Champion (Juniors)	Nations
1	2015	BiGeo	Serbia	Belgrade	Anca Maria Radulescu Romania	No Junior Category	3
2	2016	BiGeo	Serbia	Radaljska Banja	Aleksandar Tasic Serbia	Mihailo Miletic Serbia	4
3	2017	BiGeo	Slovenia	Ruše	Ioana Andrada Pantelimon Romania	Jan Lorencic Slovenia	5
4	2018	BiGeo	Romania	Iași	Razvan Popescu Romania	Filip Slakan Jakovljevic Slovenia	5
5	2019	GO	Serbia	Belgrade	Cristian Liviu Terebes Romania	Alexia Svenja Papirowski Romania	8
6 (Note: Held online due to COVID-19 pandemic)	2020	EGeo	Held online due to the COVID-19 pandemic		Simas Kontrimas Lithuania	Ugnius Zagarys Lithuania	13
7	2021	EGeo	Held online due to the COVID-19 pandemic		Mert Dillice Turkey	Ridas Urbonavicius Lithuania	13
8	2022	EGeo	Serbia	Belgrade (Note: Officially designated host; the competition was actually held online due to COVID-19 pandemic)	Sanzhar Khamitov Kazakhstan	Andreea Soie Romania	11
9	2023	EGeo	Serbia	Belgrade	Alex Topai Romania	Stefan Cristian Dragut Romania	13
10	2024	EGeo	Serbia	Kopaonik	Mikalai Misiyuk Belarus	Cosmin Ioan Dulgheru Romania	14
11	2025	EGeo	Lithuania	Vilnius	Ugnius Vilimas Lithuania	Nenu Alessio Andrei Romania	16
12	2026	EGeo	Bulgaria	Varna	Romania David-Mihai Dumitrescu	Teya Spirova Bulgaria	16
13	2027	EGeo	Serbia	Belgrade	—	—	—

== Performances ==
All-time medal table (Senior category)
National Team	Gold	Silver	Bronze	Total
Serbia	8	30	35	73
Romania	18	11	7	36
Slovenia	3	13	24	40
Bosnia and Herzegovina	1	6	18	25
Turkey	1	0	5	6
Moldova	0	2	2	4
Switzerland	0	2	6	8
Bulgaria	4	13	21	38
Kazakhstan	4	12	16	32
Latvia	1	5	10	16
Lithuania	5	7	8	20
Russia	9	18	11	38
Belarus	5	8	15	28
Estonia	3	1	4	8
Czech Republic	2	4	6	12
Belgium	0	1	2	3
Azerbaijan	0	0	3	3
Denmark	0	0	1	1
Poland	1	4	2	7
Armenia	0	0	1	1

All time medal table (Junior category)
National Team	Gold	Silver	Bronze	Total
Serbia	5	13	18	36
Romania	13	9	4	26
Slovenia	8	6	26	40
Bosnia and Herzegovina	1	1	11	14
Turkey	0	3	0	3
Bulgaria	2	7	16	25
Latvia	0	3	5	8
Lithuania	7	10	21	38
Russia	2	14	10	26
Belgium	0	0	3	3
Azerbaijan	0	0	4	4
Czech Republic	0	7	6	13
Estonia	1	2	3	6
Kazakhstan	3	3	2	8
Belarus	0	0	3	3

== See also ==
- International Geography Olympiad
- Baltic iGeo
