= World Open =

World Open may refer to:

== Golf ==
- Carling World Open, a professional golf tournament held from 1953 until 1967
- Casio World Open, a professional golf tournament held in Japan since 1981
- Sarazen World Open, a professional golf tournament held from 1994 until 1999
- World Open Golf Championship, a professional golf tournament held from 1973 until 1982

== Other sports & games ==
- World Open (squash), a squash event which serves as the individual world championship for squash players
- World Open (snooker), a professional ranking snooker tournament
- World Open chess tournament, an annual open chess tournament played in the United States
- World Poker Open, one of the annual events on the World Poker Tour

== Other ==
- World Wide Open, the debut album of the American country music band Love and Theft

== See also ==
- International Open (disambiguation)
- Open (sport)
- Open world (disambiguation)
