= International Open =

International Open may refer to:

- International Open Series, a pro-am series of snooker tournaments, also known as the Pontin's International Open Series for promotional purposes
- Scottish Open (snooker), a professional snooker tournament formerly known as the International Open
- International GT Open, a grand tourer-style sports car racing founded in 2006 by the Spanish GT Sport Organización. It is a spin-off of the Spanish GT Championship, and uses a similar format, except its races are held internationally
- Eastbourne International, a tennis tournament on the WTA Tour and on the ATP World Tour, formerly known as the "International Women's Open".
- International Tennis Open, a sports video game developed by Infogrames Multimedia and published by Philips Interactive Media in 1992
- German Open Tennis Championships, a tennis tournament the ATP World Tour, formerly known as the "International German Open"

== See also ==
- Open (sport)
- Open International (disambiguation)
- World Open (disambiguation)
