= Institute for the Promotion of Teaching Science and Technology =

- สถาบันส่งเสริมการสอนวิทยาศาสตร์และเทคโนโลยี IPST

Agency overview
- Formed: 18 January 1972
- Type: Public organization
- Jurisdiction: Government of Thailand
- Headquarters: Bangkok, Thailand; 13°43′09″N 100°34′57″E
- Agency executive: Assoc. Prof. Thiradet Jiarasuksakun, President
- Parent department: Ministry of Education
- Website: www.ipst.ac.th

The Institute for the Promotion of Teaching Science and Technology (IPST) is a Thai state agency, founded in 1972. Its responsibilities include the development of national science and mathematics curricula, and sponsorship of science education, as well as the promotion of science in general. It is also Thailand's coordinator for the International Science Olympiad.

== See also ==
- Thailand at the International Science Olympiad
