= International Geography Olympiad =

Annual geography competition

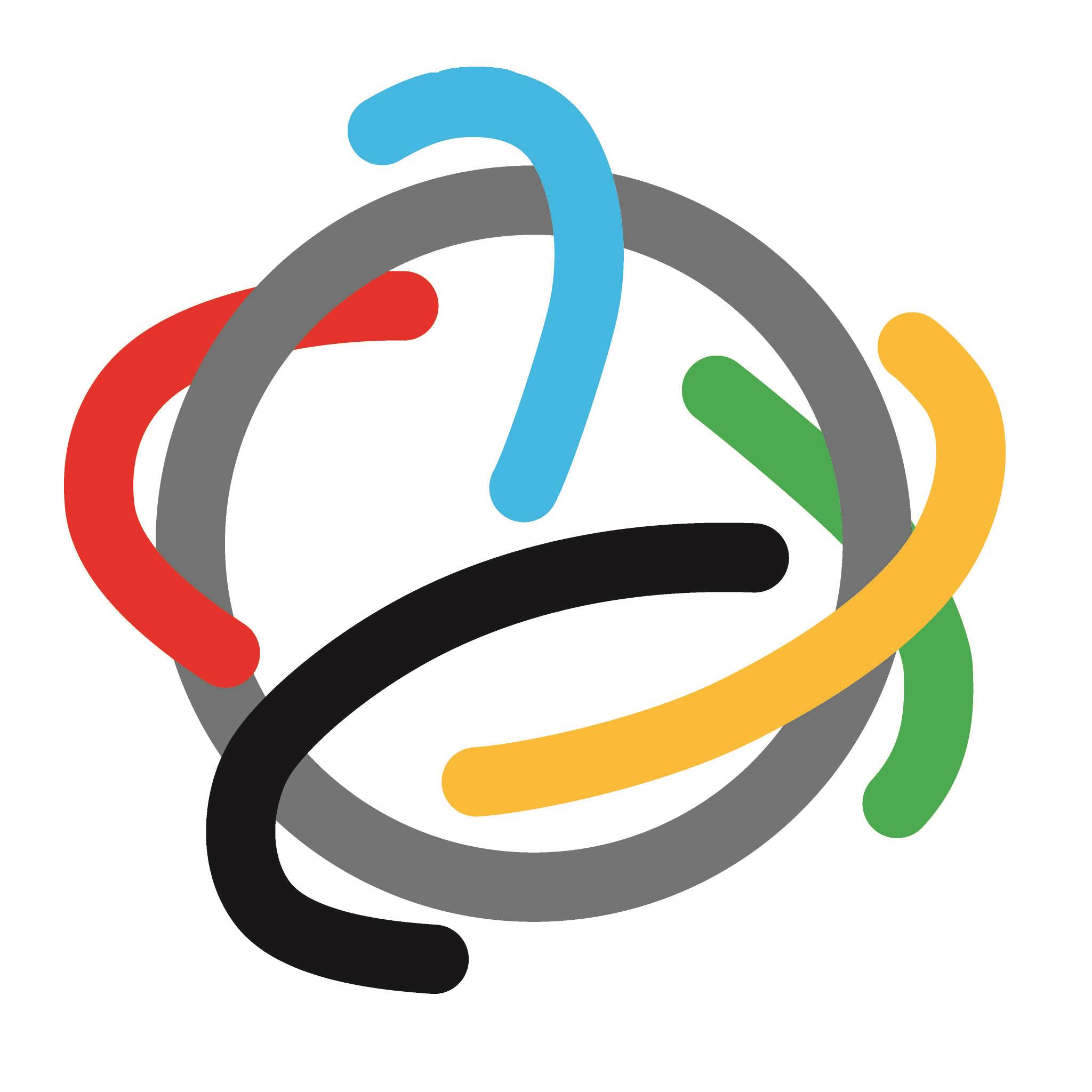
The logo of the International Geography Olympiad

The International Geography Olympiad (iGeo) is an annual geography competition for secondary school students, organized by the International Geographical Union (IGU). It is one of the International Olympiads. The first iGeo was held in 1996. The competition was held biennially until 2012, when it switched to an annual format.

Students are chosen to represent their countries from national geography olympiads. The iGeo consists of three parts: a written test, a multimedia test, and a fieldwork exercise.

== History ==
The idea of an international geography competition was proposed by Polish and Dutch geographers during the 1994 Congress of the International Geographical Union (IGU) in Prague. The first International Geography Olympiad (iGeo) was held in 1996 in The Hague, Netherlands, with five countries participating. Similarly to other Olympiads, in early years most participants in the iGeo were from Europe (especially Eastern Europe), but the competition has seen steadily increasing attendance from around the world.

Before 2012, the International Science Olympiads were held every two years, and some regional geography Olympiads were held during intervening years. Since 2012, the International Geography Olympiad, like other Olympiads, has been held on a yearly basis.

Due to the COVID-19 pandemic, the 2020 iGeo in Istanbul, Turkey was postponed. The Olympiad was held in Istanbul between 11 and 15 August the following year, with 46 countries participating. The Olympiad was held online once again in 2022, hosted by Paris. In 2023, the iGeo returned to a physical format and it was held in Bandung, Indonesia. The most recent Olympiad was held in Istanbul, Turkey in 2026 with 48 competing affiliations; subsequent Olympiads will be held in Jelgava, Latvia in 2027 and Melbourne, Australia in 2028.

== Qualification ==
Teams consist of up to four students between the ages of 16 and 19 from each participating country or region, accompanied by two adults. Students may not have begun tertiary education, and may participate at most twice. They are selected from among hundreds of thousands of students who participate in National Geography Olympiads each year, although these often vary in format from the iGeo.

Adults accompanying the teams are expected to be involved in geography education; they are expected to both supervise the team's students, and to be involved in writing and/or marking tests.

== Format ==
The test consists of three parts: a written response test, a multimedia test, and a fieldwork portion. Questions are typically open ended, and designed to assess critical thinking skills. They cover a wide range of topics across physical geography, human geography, and technical geography. The fieldwork portion is intended to give students an opportunity to visit the host country, while developing and assessing their skills to observe, analyze, and graphically represent their environment.

Question proposals for the written and multimedia tests are submitted by participating countries; final versions of the tests and rubrics, as well as the fieldwork portion, are prepared by IGU committees. Some questions are to be complete individually, while others may be completed as a group. Tests are given only in English, and for ease of scoring answers are also required to be given in English.

About half of participants receive a medal, with a ratio of 1:2:3 between gold, silver, and bronze.

== Member countries and regions ==
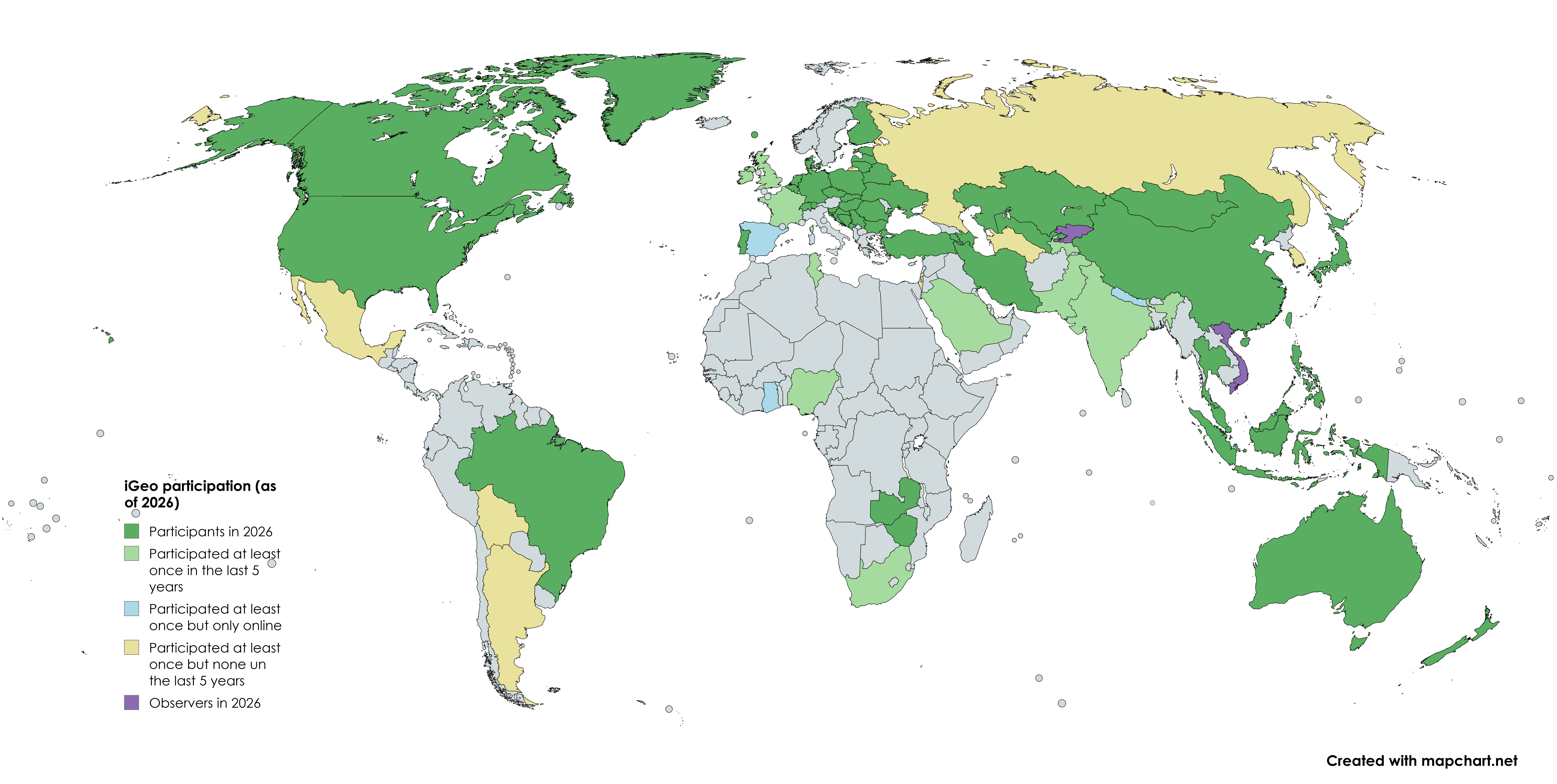
Countries/regions participating in iGeo as of 2026

The countries and regions which participated in the 2026 International Geography Olympiad were:

- Armenia
- Australia
- Azerbaijan
- Belarus
- Belgium
- Bosnia and Herzegovina
- Brazil
- Bulgaria
- Canada
- China-Beijing
- China-Hong Kong
- Taiwan
- Croatia
- Cyprus
- Czechia
- Denmark
- Estonia
- Finland
- Germany
- Hungary
- Indonesia
- Iran
- Japan
- Kazakhstan
- Kyrgyzstan (observer)
- Latvia
- Liechtenstein
- Lithuania
- Malaysia
- Mongolia
- Montenegro
- Netherlands
- New Zealand
- Philippines
- Poland
- Portugal
- Romania
- Serbia
- Singapore
- Slovakia
- Slovenia
- Switzerland
- Thailand
- Turkiye
- Ukraine
- United States
- Uzbekistan
- Vietnam (observer)
- Zambia
- Zimbabwe

A full list of participating teams for all past iGeos can be found on the iGeo website.

== Results ==
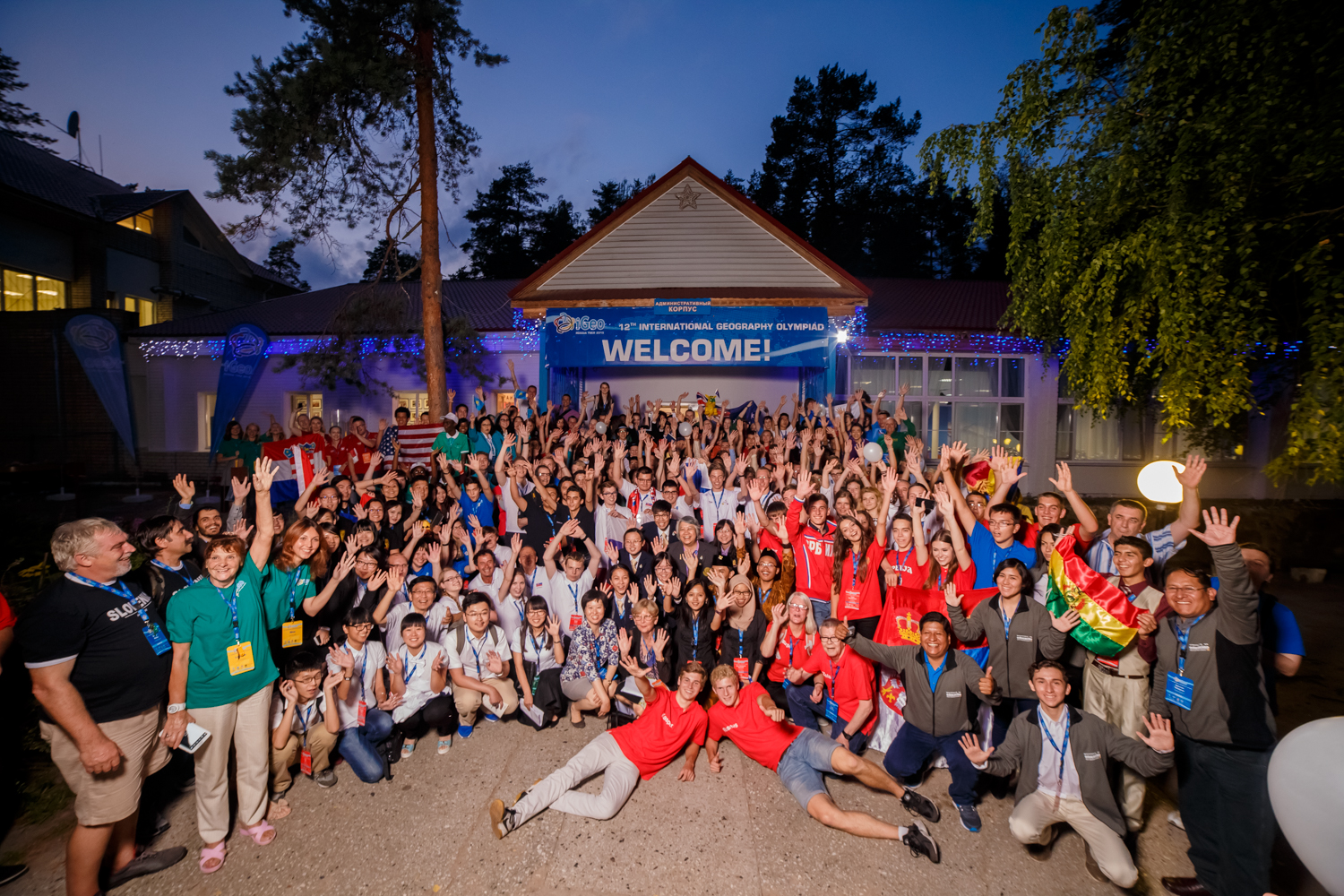
Group photo at the 12th International Geography Olympiad in Russia in August 2015.

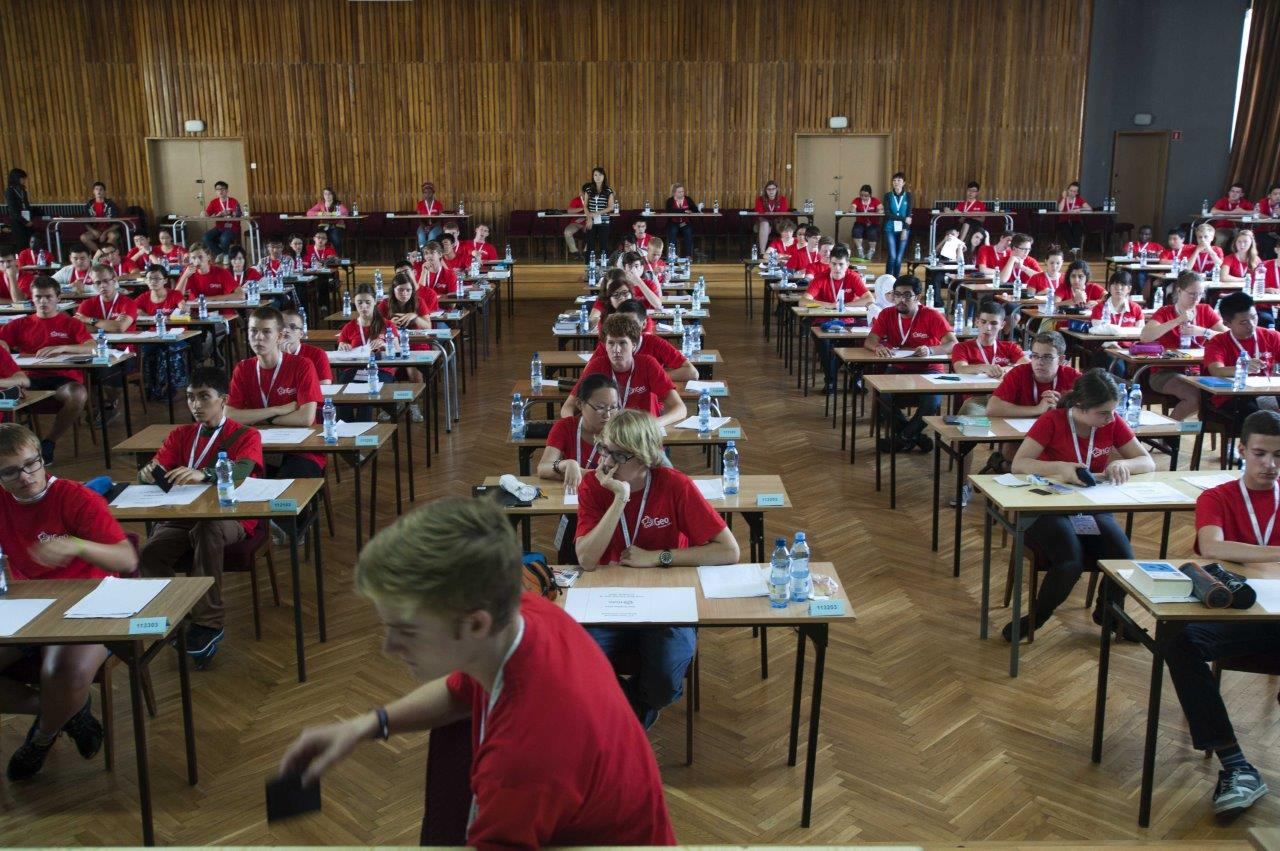
Written Response Test at the 11th International Geography Olympiad in Poland in August 2014.

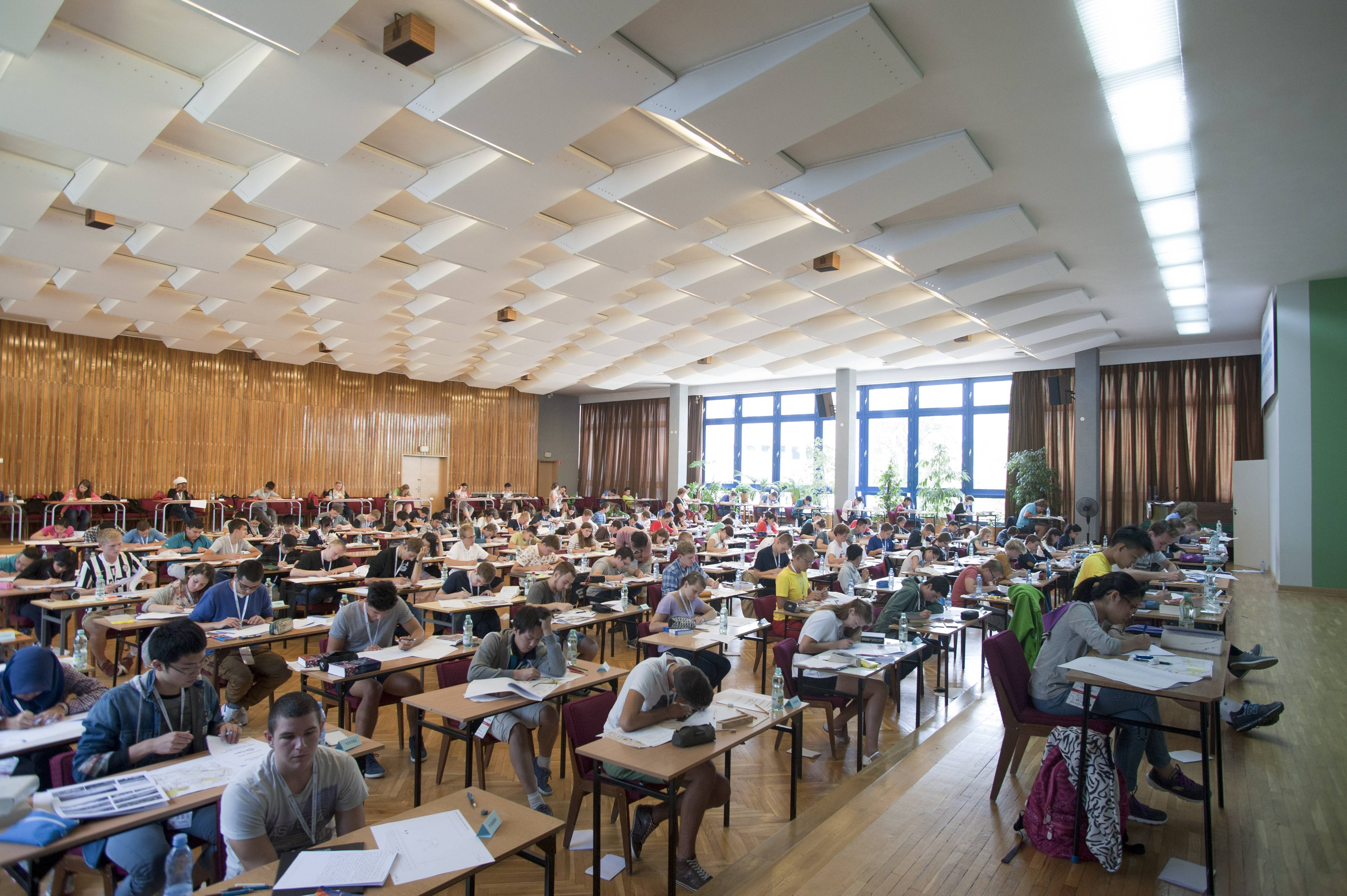
Geographical Analysis Component of the Fieldwork Exercise at 11th International Geography Olympiad in Poland in August 2014.

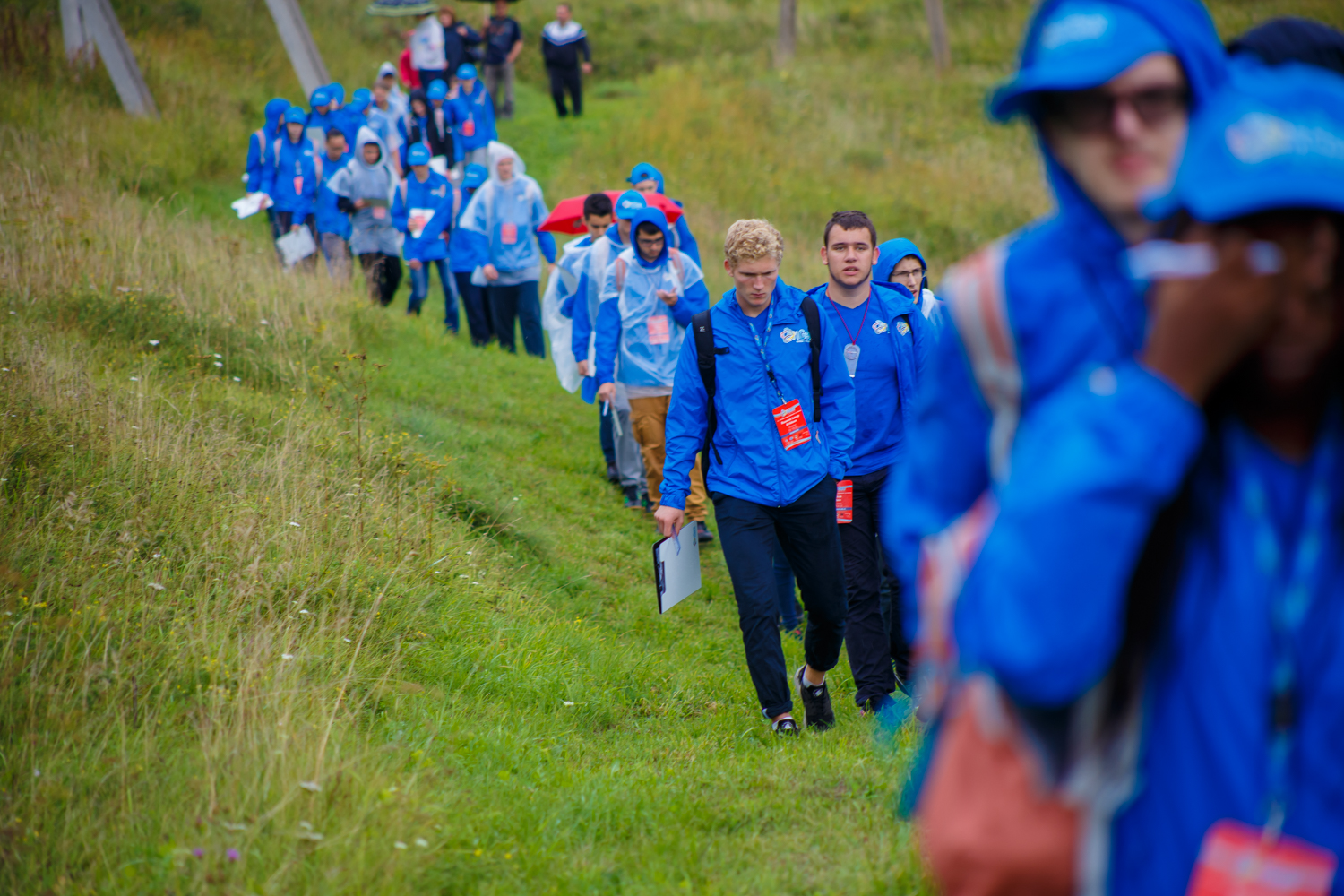
Cartographic Representation Component of the Fieldwork Exercise at 12th International Geography Olympiad in Russia in August 2015.

Number	Year	Host country	Host city	Individual Olympiad Champion	Best National Team	2nd National Team	3rd National Team	Nations	Participants
1	1996	Netherlands	The Hague	Belgium Steven Pattheeuws	Poland	Slovenia	Belgium	5	20
2	1998	Portugal	Lisbon	Poland Katarzyna Kwiecińska	Poland	Slovenia	Belgium	5	20
3	2000	South Korea	Seoul	Poland Adam Biliski	Poland	Netherlands	South Korea	13	52
4	2002	South Africa	Durban	Romania Florin Olteanu	Romania	Poland	Belarus	12	48
5	2004	Poland	Gdańsk	Poland Maciej Hermanowicz	Poland	Estonia	Romania	16	64
6	2006	Australia	Brisbane	Poland Jacek Próchniak	Poland	Estonia	Romania	23	92
7	2008	Tunisia	Carthage	Romania Barbu Ion Alexandru	Romania	Estonia	Australia	24	96
8	2010	Taiwan	Taipei	Romania Barbu Ion Alexandru	Singapore	Australia	Poland	27	108
9	2012	Germany	Cologne	Singapore Samuel Chua	Singapore	Romania	Poland	31	124
10	2013	Japan	Kyoto	Singapore Daniel Wong	Romania	Croatia	Singapore	32	128
11	2014	Poland	Kraków	USA James Mullen	Singapore	Australia	Romania	36	144
12	2015	Russia	Tver	Taiwan Chang-Chin Wang	Poland	Romania	Taiwan	40	159
13	2016	China	Beijing	Thailand Wuttipat Kiratipaisarl	Australia	Singapore	Thailand	45	173
14	2017	Serbia	Belgrade	Romania Victor Vescu	Poland	Romania	USA	41	160
15	2018	Canada	Quebec City	Russia Alen Kospanov	Romania	Singapore	USA	43	165
16	2019	Hong Kong	Hong Kong	USA Albert Zhang	Indonesia	USA	United Kingdom	43	166
—	2020	Postponed due to the COVID-19 pandemic	—	—	—	—	—	—	—
17	2021	Turkey	Istanbul (Note: Officially designated host; the competition was actually held online)	Russia Rustam Bigildin	Russia	Singapore	Japan	46	180
18	2022	France	Paris	Kazakhstan Sanzhar Khamitov	Singapore	Lithuania	Taiwan	54	216
19	2023	Indonesia	Bandung	Thailand Passakarn Leewongcharoen	Romania	Singapore	Hungary	45	177
20	2024	Ireland	Dublin and Maynooth	Romania David-Mihai Dumitrescu	USA	Australia	Indonesia	46	183
21	2025	Thailand	Bangkok	Belarus Mikalai Misiyuk	Lithuania	Kazakhstan	Poland	47	179
22	2026	Turkey	Istanbul	Kazakhstan Andrey Yenbakhtov	Lithuania	Kazakhstan	USA	48	184
23	2027	Latvia	Jelgava	—	—	—	—	—	—
24	2028	Australia	Melbourne	—	—	—	—	—	—
25	2029	Bulgaria	Burgas	—	—	—	—	—	—

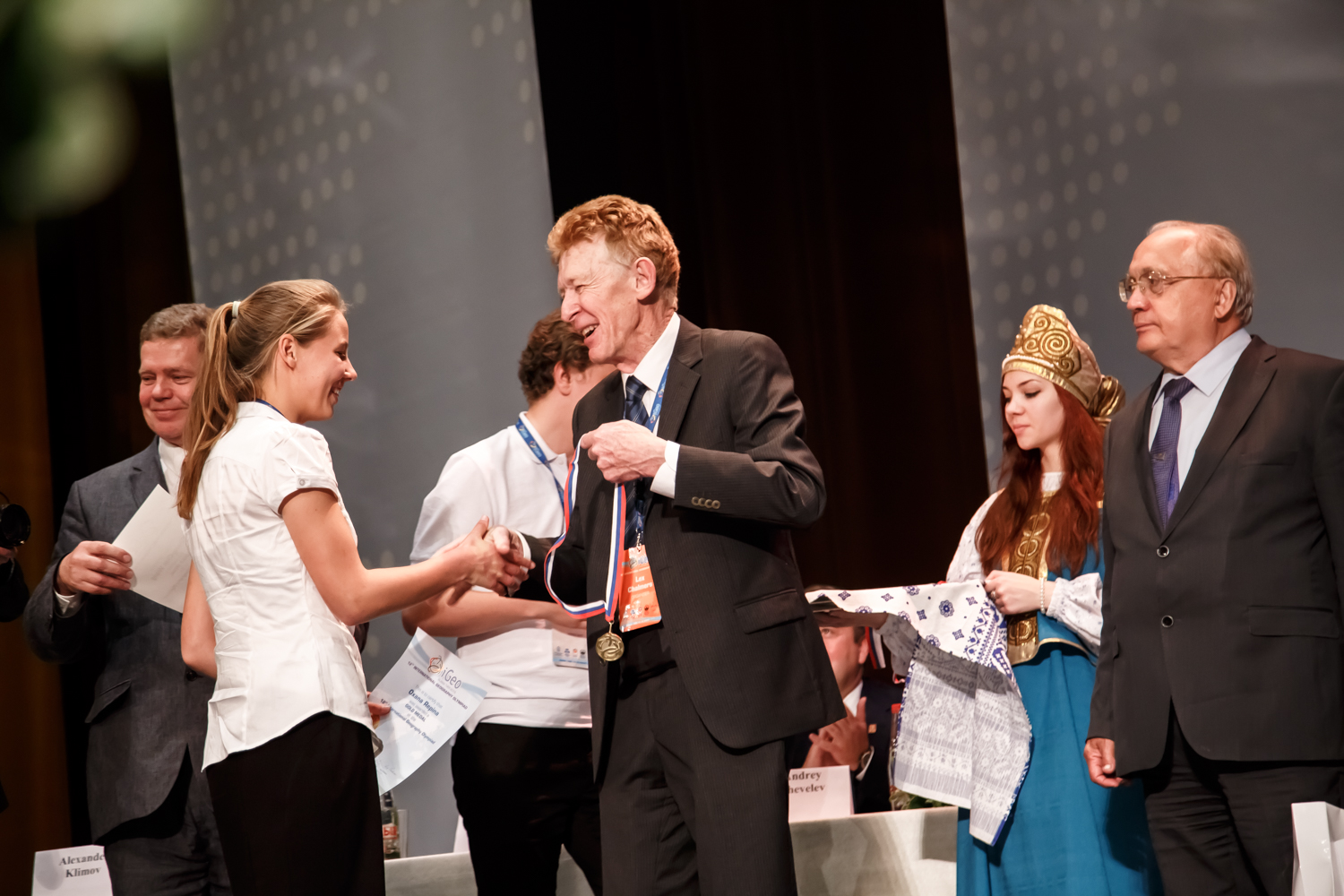
Awarding of an International Geography Olympiad Gold Medal at the Opening Ceremony of the International Geographical Union Conference in Moscow, Russia, in August 2015.

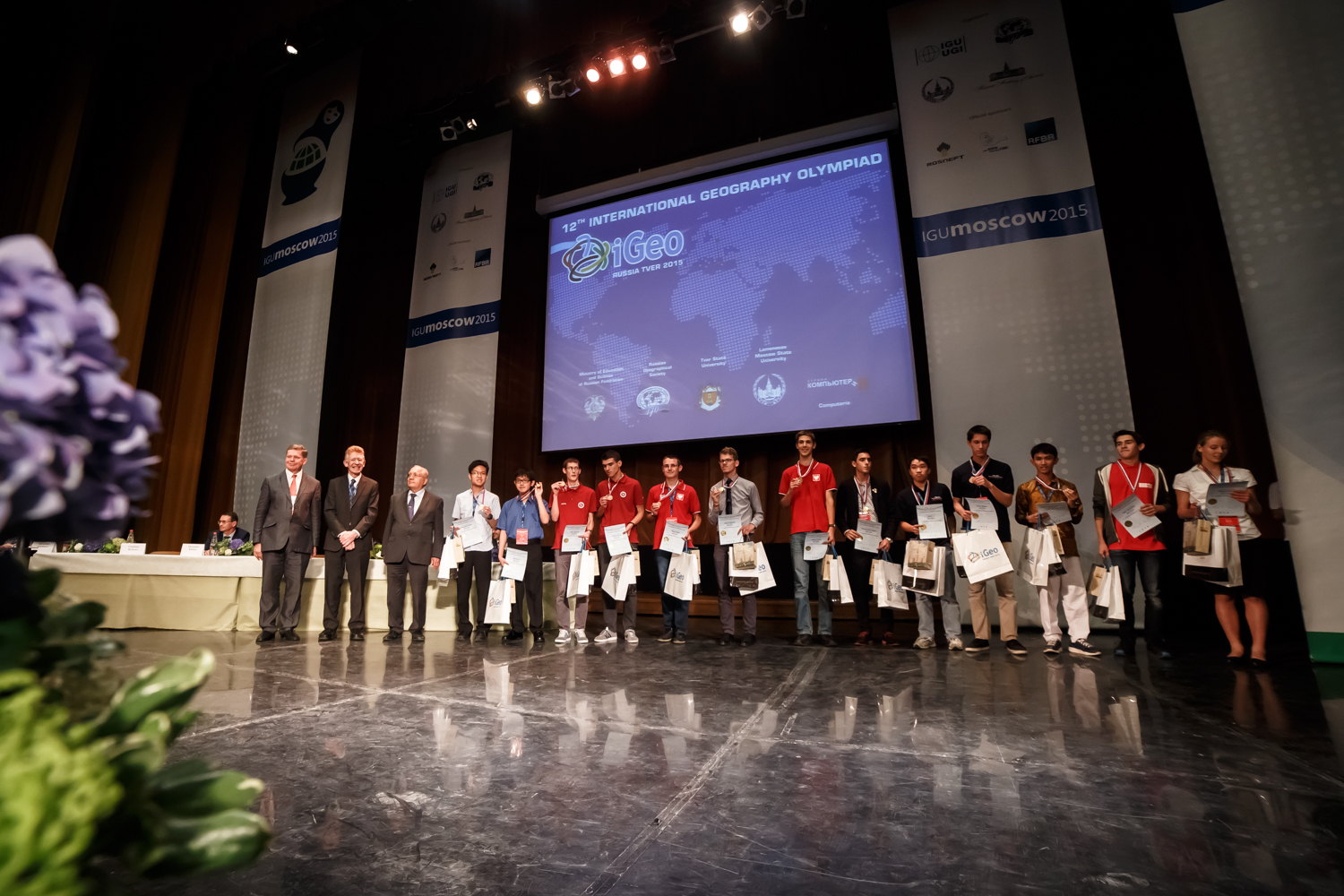
Gold Medal Winners from the 12th International Geography Olympiad at the Opening Ceremony of the International Geographical Union Conference in Moscow, Russia, in August 2015.

=== Nations by podium finishes ===
Place	National Team	1st, 2nd, 3rd	Years Champions (Teams Participating)	Years Runners Up (Teams)	Years 3rd Place (Teams)
1st	Poland	7, 1, 3	1996 (5), 1998 (5), 2000 (13), 2004 (16), 2006 (23), 2015 (40), 2017 (41)	2002 (12)	2010 (27), 2012 (31), 2025 (47)
2nd	Romania	5, 3, 3	2002 (12), 2008 (24), 2013 (32), 2018 (43), 2023 (45)	2012 (31), 2015 (40), 2017 (41)	2004 (16), 2006 (23), 2014 (36)
3rd	Singapore	4, 4, 1	2010 (27), 2012 (31), 2014 (36), 2022 (54)	2016 (45), 2018 (43), 2021 (46), 2023 (45)	2013 (32)
4th	Australia	1, 3, 1	2016 (45)	2010 (27), 2014 (36), 2024 (46)	2008 (24)
5th	Lithuania	2, 1, 0	2025 (47), 2026 (48)	2022 (54)	—
6th	USA	1, 1, 3	2024 (46)	2019 (43)	2017 (41), 2018 (43), 2026 (48)
7th	Indonesia	1, 0, 1	2019 (43)	—	2024 (46)
8th	Russia	1, 0, 0	2021 (46)	—	—
9th	Estonia	0, 3, 0	—	2004 (16), 2006 (23), 2008 (24)	—
10th (tied)	Slovenia	0, 2, 0	—	1996 (5), 1998 (5)	—
10th (tied)	Kazakhstan	0, 2, 0	—	2025 (47), 2026 (48)	—
12th (tied)	Croatia	0, 1, 0	—	2013 (32)	—
12th (tied)	Netherlands	0, 1, 0	—	2000 (13)	—
14th (tied)	Taiwan	0, 0, 2	—	—	2015 (40), 2022 (54)
14th (tied)	Belgium	0, 0, 2	—	—	1996 (5), 1998 (5)
16th (tied)	Japan	0, 0, 1	—	—	2021 (46)
16th (tied)	Hungary	0, 0, 1	—	—	2023 (45)
16th (tied)	Thailand	0, 0, 1	—	—	2016 (45)
16th (tied)	United Kingdom	0, 0, 1	—	—	2019 (43)
16th (tied)	South Korea	0, 0, 1	—	—	2000 (13)
16th (tied)	Belarus	0, 0, 1	—	—	2002 (12)

=== Nations by individual victories ===
Place	Nation	Wins	World Champions Produced (Year)
1st	Romania	5	David-Mihai Dumitrescu (2024), Victor Vescu (2017), Barbu Ion Alexandru (2010, 2008), Florin Olteanu (2002)
2nd	Poland	4	Jacek Próchniak (2006), Maciej Hermanowicz (2004), Adam Biliski (2000), Katarzyna Kwiecińska (1998)
3rd (tied)	Kazakhstan	2	Andrey Yenbakhtov (2026), Sanzhar Khamitov (2022)
3rd (tied)	Russia	2	Rustam Bigildin (2021), Alen Kospanov (2018)
3rd (tied)	Singapore	2	Daniel Wong (2013), Samuel Chua (2012)
3rd (tied)	Thailand	2	Passakarn Leewongcharoen (2023), Wuttipat Kiratipaisarl (2016)
3rd (tied)	USA	2	Albert Zhang (2019), James Mullen (2014)
8th (tied)	Taiwan	1	Chang-Chin Wang (2015)
8th (tied)	Belgium	1	Steven Pattheeuws (1996)
8th (tied)	Belarus	1	Mikalai Misiyuk (2025)

== See also ==
- Open International Geography Olympiad
- European Geography Olympiad
