= Open World Program =

US ten-day program to engage with Eurasian leaders

Open World is a ten-day program administered by the Congressional Office for International Leadership that brings emerging leaders from Eurasia to the United States to engage with professional counterparts. The program was established in 1999 to foster cultural and political ties with Russia but has since expanded outreach to other countries of the post-Soviet region. Since its inception the program has brought over 30,000 delegates to 2,300 communities throughout all 50 states.

== Program Structure ==
COIL administers rule of law, parliamentary, and civic program themes. Delegates have a one-day orientation in Washington D.C. before traveling to a hosting community. The delegates home-stay with local families and participate in a series of meetings, interviews, presentations, and panel discussions with experts in their fields.

== Congressional Office for International Leadership ==
The Congressional Office for International Leadership (COIL), formerly known as the Open World Leadership Center, administers the Open World program. The agency is part of the U.S. legislative branch and is housed in the Library of Congress in Washington D.C.

Every year, through the Senate and House Subcommittees on Legislative Branch Appropriations, U.S. Congress decides upon funding for COIL. The agency then confers grants to a variety of national organizations including Rotary clubs and other service organizations, community colleges and universities, sister-city associations, and international visitor councils.

COIL has a board of directors with eleven members. The founding chairman of the board was James H. Billington, Librarian of Congress. There are three members from the House of Representatives and three members from the Senate. In addition, there are four individuals outside of the government who have an interest in improving relations between COIL's focus countries and the United States.
