= Kasturirangan =

Kasturirangan is a surname. Notable people with the surname include:

- Gopalaswamy Kasturirangan (1930–2020), Indian cricketer
- Krishnaswamy Kasturirangan (born 1940), Indian space scientist
- Rajesh Kasturirangan (fl. from 1993), Indian mathematician
