= International Philosophy Olympiad =

Philosophy competition for high school students

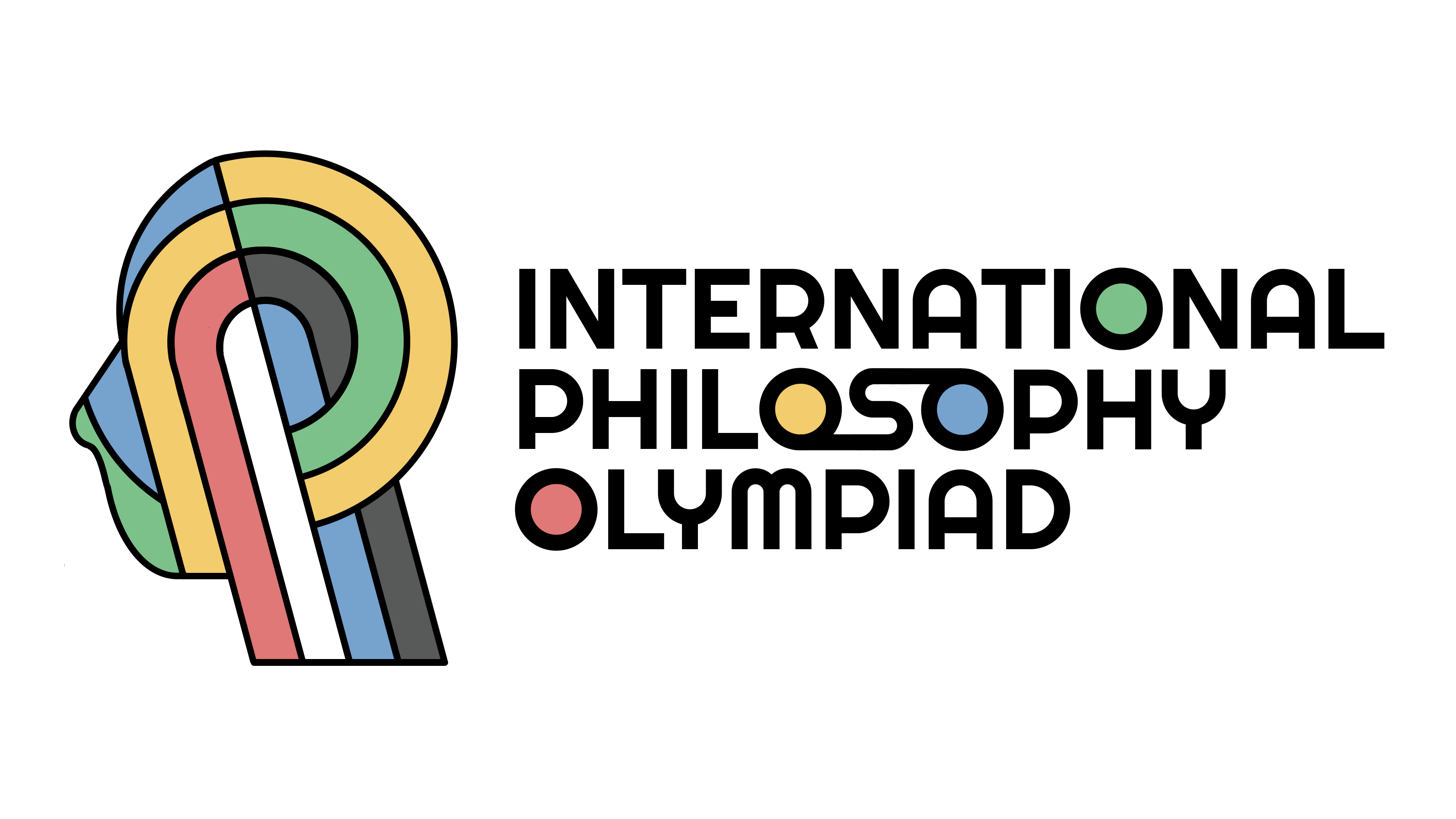
The logo of the International Philosophy Olympiad.

The International Philosophy Olympiad (IPO) is an annual philosophy competition for high school students from around the world, one of the International Science Olympiads. It is organized under the auspices of the International Federation of Philosophical Societies (FISP) and supported by UNESCO.

== History ==
The International Philosophy Olympiad was founded through an initiative by Ivan Kolev from Sofia University in Bulgaria. The idea was to help replace the Marxist–Leninist subjects taught in schools throughout Eastern Europe between 1947 and 1990. The first Olympiad was held in 1993 in Smolyan, Bulgaria, with three participating countries: Bulgaria, Romania (led by Elena Florina Otet), and Turkey (led by Nuran Direk). The second edition of the Olympiad, in 1994 in Petrich, Bulgaria, two additional countries joined: Poland (led by Władysław Krajewski) and Germany (led by Gerd Gerhardt). Together with Hungary (led by Katalin Havas) these countries founded the IPO. The IPO received welcome by UNESCO. Since 2001 the International Philosophy Olympiads have been organized under the auspices of International Federation of Philosophical Societies (FISP) and with the recognition and support of UNESCO.

In 2009 the number of participating countries rose from under 30 to about 40. The IPO 2020 originally scheduled to be held in Lisbon had to be cancelled because of measures against the COVID-19 pandemic. An electronic IPO (e-IPO) is organized by Slovenia.

== Regulations ==
=== Objectives ===
According to the regulations, the objectives of the IPO are the following:

- to promote philosophical education at the secondary school level and increase the interest of high school pupils in philosophy;
- to encourage the development of national, regional, and local contests in philosophy among pre-university students worldwide;
- to contribute to the development of critical, inquisitive and creative thinking;
- to promote philosophical reflection on science, art, and social life;
- to cultivate the capacity for ethical reflection on the problems of the modern world; and,
- by encouraging intellectual exchanges and securing opportunities for personal contacts between young people from different countries, to promote the culture of peace.

=== Administration ===
The IPO is run by the following bodies: the International Committee, consisting of the delegation leaders having already organized an IPO, the Steering Board, consisting of members from the FISP, UNESCO and the International Committee, the National Organizing Committee, and the International Jury, consisting of all delegation leaders and teachers.

=== Competition ===
Students competing in the Olympiad are given four hours to write a philosophical essay on one of four topics given. The topics are provided in the four official languages of the IPO – English, Spanish, French, and German – and the student must choose to write in a language other than his/her own; that is, a native French speaker would not be allowed to write in French.

There are five criteria of evaluation.

1. Relevance to the topic
2. Philosophical understanding of the topic
3. Coherence
4. Power of argumentation
5. Originality

Evaluation proceeds in three stages:

1. International Jury composed of teachers from different delegations form groups of about 4–5 to read certain number of the essays. Each member of a group reads the same 5-6 essays, then compares notes with other members of the same group and gives his mark/score on a scale of 10. Those above average score of 7.0 from being thus read make it to the next level. No teacher is allowed to read the essay of a student from his/her own country.
2. About four members of the International Jury then individually reads those essays which are according to the criteria below:
  1. Those getting average 7.0 or above in previous stage
  2. Those having a difference in marking by two jury members of more than 3.0 point
3. Those finally making a new average of 7.0 or above are recommended by the international jury to the steering board with five members from the FISP and the international committee. Each person in this board reads each essay individually. The steering board then decides the medals and honorable mentions to be given. They need not accept the ranking of essays as given by the international jury.

== National selection processes ==
According to the regulations, the selection of the candidates participating for a particular country are chosen through a selection process which should be organized or be under the auspices of a national philosophical organization member of the FISP. The precise structure of the national competition varies from country to country. National delegations may establish additional eligibility criteria beyond those contained in the IPO Statutes, provided these criteria are publicly communicated before the national selection process begins.

=== Argentina ===
In Argentina, the selection process for the IPO has two stages. There are three axes, each oriented towards a different branch of philosophy. Students compete in the axis of their choice. The regional stage consists of a three-question test plus an essay answer, which covers the first and second units of each axis (ancient and modern philosophy). At the end of this stage, a total of five students are chosen per province regardless of their axis. The Autonomous City of Buenos Aires and the group of pre-university secondary schools affiliated with the University of Buenos Aires act as two extra provinces of their own, resulting in a total of twenty-five jurisdictions with five students each. The national stage consists of a two-question test plus a short essay, and it covers the third and fourth units: contemporary philosophy and Latin American philosophy. There is a first, second and third place per axis plus honorable mentions. The first places of each axis are then ranked, and the best two of the three qualify for the IPO. In 2026, the Argentine Philosophy Olympiad (Spanish: Olimpíada Argentina de Filosofía) rebranded to the Argentine Philosophy Competition (Spanish: Certamen Argentino de Filosofía).

=== Austria ===
Austria first took part in the IPO in 2005. Since then they have two stages. In the first stage, every bundesland (state) sends the best two or three participants of the Landeswettbewerb to the philosophical akademie. There the second stage takes place and in this Bundeswettbewerb the two best will be sent to the IPO. The first Austrian participant were part of the German delegation in 2004.

=== Czech Republic ===
The Czech Republic's philosophical competition for high school students was established by Tomáš Nejeschleba at the Department of Philosophy, Faculty of Arts, Palacký University in Olomouc in 2011. Since 2012, the competition, called Nebojme se myslet, consists of two stages. In the first stage, students write an essay on one of four topics in Czech. The criteria are the same as in the IPO: relevance to the topic, philosophical understanding of the topic, coherence, power of argumentation, originality. The twenty best essays are qualified for the second stage in which students write a short essay in one of the four official IPO languages. The two best students qualify for the IPO. Since 2014, Jan Čížek from Palacký University has been the main organizer of the Czech philosophical competition. He is also the leader of the Czech delegation at the IPO.

=== Estonia ===
In Estonia, the selection process, which was initiated by philosopher Leo Luks, consists of two stages. In the first stage, students write an essay at home in their mother tongue. This means that Russian for the country's Russian minority is also accepted. The national jury (5 members) chooses the 10 best essays for the next stage. In the second round (4 days long), finalists first spend two days together where they participate in different lectures and workshops. After that, the final competition begins, which consists of four different parts:

1. 4-hour essay in foreign language, as it is in IPO (maximum 50 points)
2. Test of informal logic (10 points)
3. Test of central philosophical notions and theories (10 points)
4. Oral 1 to 1 debate on philosophical issue (10 points)

The two best students represent the country at the IPO.

=== Germany ===
In Germany, there are three stages:

1. The best two or three essays of a class (written in German) are sent to the jury (until December, 6th); the good essays will be honoured by a certificate.
2. The best 26 essay-writers are invited to Münster for four days in February, where they write again an essay (in English or French) and hear and discuss two philosophy lectures.
3. The two highest-scoring essayists from the national round in Münster represent Germany at the International Philosophy Olympiad (IPO) each May. Because the IPO grants national delegation leaders considerable autonomy without direct oversight of domestic selection procedures, eligibility criteria have varied in practice. During his tenure as leader of the German delegation, Dr. Gerd Gerhardt reportedly applied an additional requirement of German citizenship in certain instances, excluding non-citizen students enrolled at German secondary schools. For example, while Gerhardt permitted an Austrian student attending a German secondary school, to represent Germany at the 2004 IPO in South Korea, a Slovak student enrolled at a German secondary school was barred from representing Germany at the 2026 IPO in Warsaw, Poland. Gerhardt resigned from his position as leader of the German delegation following the 2026 Olympiad, and national citizenship is no longer applied as a formal or informal requirement to represent Germany.

=== Hungary ===
The IPO selection procedure in Hungary is closely related to and based on the National Students Competition in philosophy, which is embedded in a wide range of National high-school competitions organized under the auspices of the Ministry of Education. All the competitions (mathematics, etc.) are organized in 3 levels, over January - April. The competitions in philosophy involve 11th and mainly 12th grade students, altogether approx. 300 students nationwide. The first, school-level round is based on testing knowledge in history of philosophy (thus emphasizing the relevance of the curricula and maturity criteria). Students with sufficient score are eligible to enter the 2nd round. The second round is about writing an essay, students are free to select one topic out of four. The best papers are selected by a jury of Academics, which consists of Faculty staff members invited by the ME, who will invite the students to the finals, i.e. an oral examination. Hungarian is the only official language all through the national competition levels. The IPO Selection invites the best 30 students after the 2nd round. Under the supervision of the Hungarian Philosophical Society, a new Jury are being invited who will propose the 4 quotations, and they should evaluate all the papers. Students will take part at the IPO selection where all the IPO rules and regulations are respected: essay-writing, bi-lingual dictionary, timing, evaluation criteria, languages, etc. Usually approx. 15 students take part at the IPO selection and the authors of best 2 papers are proposed to participate at the IPO. Students receive assistance from their teachers to participate at the competitions, however the Philosophical Youth Camps and the „Philosophical tea-house” movement (inspired by IPO colleagues in Turkey) may also help students to gain and deepen their interest in philosophy.

=== India ===
The Indian team did not participate for a few years, but has now restarted.

The Olympiad was non-funded and thus a totally voluntary effort for both the teachers and students. The selection process, which was organized by Kedar Soni, was in two stages:

1. Abhinav Philosopher - objective and subjective tasks online to primarily gauge students logical and verbal reasoning. Held around beginning of December by Abhinav Vidyalay. (school which coordinates the process) Top 20% are selected to the next stage.
2. Indian Philosophy Olympiad - Essay round similar in format to the IPO competition. It is held online around January in a time-bound manner.

The two best from the stage 2 represent the country, provided they can fund themselves. Then the training program is held for a couple of weeks, to orient students to systematic philosophy and argumentation. It runs for about 12 hours a day and students need to be accommodated at the venue. Those clearing stage 1 are also invited in order to prepare them for next IPO.\ - Was paused in 2008, but has now been resumed.

According to the OC, the IPO's internal politicking has caused them to discontinue organising India's IPO selection.

=== Norway ===
In 2005, the first year of Norway participating in the IPO, Thor Steinar Grødal just picked his two best philosophy students at Foss high school, in 2006 he and Olav Birkeland picked one each as Foss High School and Oslo Handelsgymnasium were the only ones in Oslo and possibly in the whole of Norway that offered a philosophy course for high school students. Since 2007 a new subject 'history&philosophy' (5 lessons per week in 2nd and 3rd grade) has been introduced to many high schools in Norway, and the selection process for IPO has been tied up to the Baltic Sea Philosophy Essay Competition. 100 Norwegian students from 14 schools participated in this competition in November 2011. In 2012 there was for the first time a 2nd round in Oslo March 23–24 for the 10 best Norwegian participants. These ten went to IPO Oslo 2012 on the extended quota of the host country.

=== Switzerland ===
The selection process was initiated in 2005 by Jonas Pfister, and 2006 was the first year Switzerland participated in the IPO. The selection process is organized by the association SwissPhilO, the president of which is Lara Gafner, a former IPO participant for Switzerland. From 2005 to 2012, the selection process consisted of two stages, a first round and a second round. Since 2013 the selection process consists of three stages. At the first stage, students write an essay at school or at home. Out of these, the authors of the best essays are invited to a second round, a semi-final, where they participate in workshops and write a second essay. Again, the authors of the best essays qualify for the next round, the national final, where the students again participate in workshops and write another essay. A jury of five members selects the two best who will represent the country at the IPO.

=== United States ===
The United States participated in IPO competitions four times until 2003. In 2001, the IPO was hosted by the US in Philadelphia. From 2003 until 2011, however, the US did not participate. At the 2009 December conference meeting of the American Philosophical Association (APA), Eastern Division teacher Joseph A. Murphy met with APA executive director, David Schrader, and told him about the curriculum for a course 'A History of Western Philosophy' taught in Spanish for American high school students in their last two years before university. Over the next year, the course was approved by the Curriculum Committee at Dwight-Englewood School (D-E). David Schrader and William McBride had been discussing ways to reanimate the US philosophy community to re-enter the IPO competitions. Adding Spanish as an official IPO language was seen to be a possible key to doing this. Spanish was added to English, French and German on a trial basis before IPO Vienna 2011. In order to participate in IPO Vienna 2011, Murphy chose two of his best philosophy students who also studied Spanish at D-E. Together they formed the 2011 US Delegation with the blessing of APA. Since then, there has been a national competition for high school students called the American Philosophy Olympiad, in which high school students from around the nation submit philosophy essays in either Spanish, French, or German in response to a given prompt. The two top essays are chosen, and those two students represent the United States at the IPO.

=== Italy ===
Currently, the selection process for IPO in Italy happens through the "Campionati (Ex Olimpiadi) di Filosofia" which are a ministerially recognized competition. It articulates in two sections: A, which is in Italian, and B, which is in a foreign language (to qualify for IPO you need to participate in section B choosing as language English). Firstly, the schools will have to register for the competition, foreign schools can also participate. The first phase is scholastic and it consists of having the students participating writing an essay (on one of the three usual IPO topics, that was chosen by the school evaluation committee) with a time limit of 4 hours, the essay is then evaluated by the school evaluation committee, which makes a classific; the first two scorers of each school for the section A and for the section B will then participate in the regional phase (there are 20 regions plus an additional 1 for students participating from foreign schools). The regional phase is held online (from students' houses or schools) and the structure is the same as that of the scholastic phase. Afterwards, 2 students per section (A and B) for each region qualify for the national phase, which is held on-site (but a student can also participate online if they have some complications that occurs) and has got the same structure as the former phases. In the end, the top 2 students of section B (with English as chosen language), in the national phase, are those who will represent Italy at the IPO.

== Overview of competitions ==
Each year, the IPO is held in a different city around the world. The table below gives an overview of each competition since the inaugural competition in 1993.

No.	Year	City	Country	Theme	Dates		Participating countries
1	1993	Smolyan	Bulgaria		May		3
2	1994	Petrich	Bulgaria		May		5
3	1995	Stara Zagora	Bulgaria		May		5
4	1996	Istanbul	Turkey		May		6
5	1997	Warsaw	Poland		May		7
6	1998	Braşov	Romania		April		8
7	1999	Budapest	Hungary		May		11
8	2000	Münster	Germany		May		11
9	2001	Philadelphia	United States		May		15
10	2002	Tokyo	Japan		May 12	May 16	15
11	2003	Buenos Aires	Argentina		May 7	May 10	18
12	2004	Seoul	South Korea		May 19	May 23	17
13	2005	Warsaw	Poland		May 19	May 23	18
14	2006	Cosenza	Italy		May 13	May 18	15
15	2007	Antalya	Turkey		May 18	May 21	22
16	2008	Iaşi	Romania		May 18	May 22	23
17	2009	Helsinki	Finland		May 22	May 26	22
18	2010	Athens	Greece		May 20	May 24	23
19	2011	Vienna	Austria	Power and Powerlessness of Philosophy	May 26	May 29	28
20	2012	Oslo	Norway	Limits of Freedom	May 16	May 20	39
21	2013	Odense	Denmark	Kierkegaard Today	May 16	May 20	37
22	2014	Vilnius	Lithuania	Emmanuel Levinas: Infinity and the Face of the Other	May 15	May 16	40
23	2015	Tartu	Estonia	Disagreement	May 14	May 18	40
24	2016	Ghent	Belgium	War and Peace	May 12	May 15	44
25	2017	Rotterdam	Netherlands	Tolerance	May 25	May 28	45
26	2018	Bar	Montenegro	Environment	May 23	May 28	50
27	2019	Rome	Italy	Cultural Heritage and Citizenship	May 16	May 19	50
28	2020	Ljubliana	Slovenia	Global Solidarity	May 28	May 31	organized as online competition (eIPO)
29	2021	Ljubliana	Slovenia	Utopie	May 27	May 30	organized as online competition (eIPO)
30	2022	Lisbon	Portugal	Identity and Person	May 26	May 29	Originally planned for 2020 and then cancelled due to the COVID-19 pandemic and reported to 2022 (Note: The 28th IPO was originally scheduled to be held from May 21 to 24, 2020.)
31	2023	Olympia	Greece	A Life in Fair Competition	May 11	May 14	
32	2024	Helsinki	Finland	A changing World	May 16	May 19	52
33	2025	Bari	Italy	Conviviality	May 15	May 18	
34	2026	Warsaw	Poland	Freedom & Reason	May 14	May 17	

== Overview of awards ==
Year	Location	Gold medal	Silver medal	Bronze medal	Honourable mention
1993	Bulgaria
1994	Petrich, Bulgaria
1995	Stara Zagora, Bulgaria
1996	Istanbul, Turkey	Ceren Arkman TUR
1997	Warsaw, Poland
1998	Braşov, Romania
1999	Budapest, Hungary
2000	Münster, Germany	Ognyan Kassabov BGR	Gianluca Rossi ITA	Boris Popivanov BGR
2001	Philadelphia, EE. UU.	Ute Scholl DEU	Laura Lapierre VEN	Felix von Lehmden DEU
2002	Tokyo, Japan	Silvia Crupano ITA	Vasilescu Ion Gheorghe ROU	Akse Pettersson FIN
2003	Buenos Aires, Argentina	Torsten Schoeneberg DEU	Sergio Barberis ARG	Gabriel Abelof ARG	Sarah Helduser DEU Mete Tuczu TUR; Hyun Lee ROK; Francesco D'Acunto ITA; Wojciech Orowiecki POL; Andrei Poamă ROU; Sezen Kayhan TUR
2004	Seoul, ROK	Leopold Hess POL	Joanna Kusiak POL Lukas Steinacher AUT; Mert Bahadir Reisoglu TUR	Seungwon Chang ROK Matija Lavrinc SVN; Germán Díaz ARG; Valeriya T. Vitkova BGR; Elena Bellodi ITA; David Kovacs HUN; Andreea Elena Simion ROU
2005	Warsaw, Poland	Mikolaj Ratajczak POL Tomasz Przezdziecki POL; Alexandru Marcoci ROU	Marta Sznajder POL Antti Saarilahti FIN; Nora Labo ROU	David Himler AUT Patricio Kingston ARG; Woo Chan Lee ROK; Jutta Obertegger ITA; Jae Won Choi ROK	Roberta Di Nanni ITA Agnieszka Kurzemska POL; Marcin Kotowski POL
2006	Cosenza, Italy	Efe Murat Balikcioglu TUR	Mateusz Chaberski POL	Saila Kakko FIN	Johann Alexander DEU Santiago Auat ARG; Stefano Burzo ITA; Margherita Busti ITA; Anna Drozdowicz POL; Florin-Radu Gogianu ROU; Carmen Kautto FIN; Conrad Krausche CHE; Maximilian Huber AUT; Sara Musi ITA; Shapira Shiri ISR; Andras Schuller HUN; Joseph Steinlechner AUT; Daniel Thoms DEU; Peter Ujma HUN; Christian Danielov Vatchkov BGR
2007	Antalya, Turkey	Zeynep Pamuk TUR	Daria Cybulska POL Stefan Stefanovic SRB	Alexander Johann DEU Martin Hergouth SVN; Soh Hyun-Min ROK	Elena Alexandra Corbu ROU Matthias Hoernes AUT; Milena Alexandrova Alexandrova BGR; Filip Taterka POL; Clara Kropivsek SVN; Corina Cristine Lefter ROU; Heidi Meriste EST; Luca Vegetti ITA; Bernát Iváncsics HUN; Christoph Schachenhofer AUT; Nanako Kurioka Japan
2008	Iași, Romania	Jan Seidel DEU Sergiu Matei Lucaci ROU; Maria Alexandra Baneu ROU	Conrad Krausche CHE Heta Nuutinen FIN; Andrea Beghini ITA; Michal Godziszewski POL	Arina Cristina Baibarac ROU Helene Sorgner AUT; Denis Tramonte ITA; Tal Yankovitz ISR; Kristina Kashfullina RUS	Perczel János HUN Vallari Sawant IND; Adrian Cristian Ardelean ROU; Toth Olivér István HUN; Maria Ciurchea ROU; Antoine Vuille CHE; Yuval David Hananel ISR; Illia Gorbachev RUS; Lukas Paltanavičius LTU; Dalius Petrulionis LTU; Sebastian Köthe DEU
2009	Helsinki, Finland	Sarri Nironen FIN	Eliza Tymianska POL Petar Penev BGR	Kristina Kashfullina RUS Luiza Pasca ROU	Hyun-Kyu KimROK Ayse Dilek Izek TUR; Pietari Kupiainen FIN; Patrick Mujunen FIN
2010	Athens, Greece	Aljaž Jelenko SVN	Kacper Kowalczyk POL Jaehyun Yoo ROK	Tibor Backhausz HUN Valeriu Alexandru Cuc ROU; Josef Piras ITA	Erik Ramberg NOR Ignas Rubikas LTU; Anita Ignatova BGR; Anna Smertina EST; Alessio Rocca ITA; Paul Kuuse EST; Tae Heun Kim ROK; Tapani Pulkkinen FIN; Platias Nikolaos GRC; Henning Rognlien NOR; Irina Horodinca ROU; Murel Leuenberger CHE; Chitra Adkar IND; Nikolina Budan CRO; Firat Akova TUR; Karoliina Juulia Pulkkinen FIN
2011	Vienna, Austria	Nikolaj Møller DNK	Chang Hyun Choi ROK José Gusmão Rodrigues PRT	Niklas Plaetzer DEU Sakari Nuuttila FIN; Stavros Orfeas Zormbalas GRC	Mustafa Ayçiçegi TUR Tibor Backhausz HUN; Franziska Bahl AUT; Miguel de la Riva DEU; Cristina Costina Diamant ROU; Vanessa Gstrein AUT; Milana Kostic SRB; Jwa Seong Lee ROK; Luka Mikec CRO; Dominykas Milašius LTU; Patrick Mokre AUT; Junho Oh CAN; Thierry Schütz CHE; Barbara Šoda CRO; Marie Vestergaard-Thomsen DNK
2012	Oslo, Norway	Sarah Yoon ROK Tadas Kriščiūnas LTU	Jeff Granhøj DNK Aleksi ROKpela FIN; Myrto Vlazaki GRC; Nishith Bharat Khandwala IND	Niklas Plaetzer DEU Abhinav Suresh Menon IND; Stian Follevaag Ersvær NOR	Kasper Siim Viftrup DNK Vaclav Masek Sánchez GTM; Guy Yassor ISR; Sun Young Hwang ROK; Justine Zepa LVA; Michail Skalskis LTU; Djuro Ilic MNE; Sadaf Soloukey NLD; Lars Borge Hellesylt NOR; Diogo José Martins Lopes PRT; Corina Ezaru ROU; Darko Peric SRB
2013	Odense, Denmark	Róbert Palasik HUN	Theo Anders AUT Abhinav Menon IND; Hye Jin Lee ROK	Petra Požgaj HRV	Juan Nigri ARG Esteban van Volcem BEL; Martin Kamenov Iliev BGR; Anton Thorell Steinø DNK; David Therkildsen DNK; Magnus Baunsgaard Kris DNK; Ida Mosegaard DNK; Märt Belkin EST; Neal Graham DEU; Jonathan Krude DEU; Maria Oikonomoy-Makrygianni GRC; Lauris Zvirbulis LVA; Miša Skalskis LTU; Dominika Pankow POL; José Forte PRT; Vraciu Cosmin Petru ROU; Denis Horvat SVN; Léonore Stangherlin CHE; Patrick Côté CHE; Estaban van Volcem BEL; Patric Coté CHE; Dominika Pankow POL
2014	Vilnius, Lithuania	Vulpe Dan Cristian ROU Elina Karstie FIN; Jakob Gomolka DEU; Lukas Jonuška LTU	Jacob Karlsson Lagerros SWE Beatriz Santos PRT; Iván György Merkei BGR; Abhishek Dedhe IND; João Madeira PRT; Tadas Temčinas LTU; Radosław Jurczak POL; Chagajeg Soloukey Tbalvandany NLD	Benedikt Zöchling AUT Rafail Zoulis GRC; Maša Marić HRV; Justinas Mickus LTU; Janko Zeković MNE; Francisco Ríos Viñuela ESP; Bernt Johan Damslora NOR; Jani Patrakka FIN	Federico Aguilar GTM Chan Park ROK; Sophus Svarre Rosendahl DNK; Viviana de Santis ITA; Yuki Kanai JPN; Martin Molan SVN; Marta-Liisa Talvet EST; Rūta Karpauskaitė LTU; Vraciu Cosmin PetruROU
2015	Tartu, Estonia	Iván György Merker HUN Antti Autio FIN	Chagajeg Soloukey Tbalvandany NLD Eleftherios Chatzitheodorides GRC; David Gjorgoski MKD; Martin Molan SVN; Sandro Huber AUT; Neven Borak SVN; Abhishek Dedhe IND; Öznur Hancı TUR	Ludovico Machet ITA Dārta Paula Šveisberga LVA; Rosaria Caddeo ITA; Stanisław Jędrczak POL; Teodora Groza ROU; Anda Maria Zahiu ROU	Ivona Janjic SRB Antonina Jamrozik POL; Ana Paula Bellamy OrozcoGTM; Augustė Saladytė LTU; Konstantin Krasimirov Tumanov BGR; Lara Gafner CHE; Helen Maria RaadnikCHE; Liisi Voll EST; Petar Soldo HRV; Niklas Uhmeier DEU; Fredrik Johnsson CHE; Zsolt Hegyesi HUN; Kyu Bo Shim ROK; Ragna Heyne DEU; Viachaslau Verashchahin BLR; Nadal Abril Lucia Molina ARG; Alžběta Vítková CZE; Audun Rugstad NOR; Deyan Kirilov Madzharski BGR
2016	Ghent, Belgium	Ihsan Baris Gedizlioglu TUR Eui Young Kim ROK; Jungho Choi ROK	Hana Samaržija HRV Teodora Groza ROU; Johanna U. Marstrander NOR; Drishtti Rawat IND	Fabian Strobel DEU Svit Komel SVN; Matthijs de Jong NLD; Sarp Çelikel TUR; Sara Pyykölä FIN	Liwia Rogalewicz POL Anna Morandini AUT; Tathagat Bhatia IND; Sonja Stiebahl DEU; Alexandre Eira POR; Uladzislau Voinich BLR; Ábrahám Horváth HUN; Jan Brändle CHE; Matija Pušnik SVN; Roberta Del Pezzo ITA; Andreea Ioana Aelenei ROU; Matthias Verlinden BEL; Emil Kotzev BGR; Lilja Valtonen FIN; Aistė Grušnytė LTU; Helo Liis Soodla EST; Tomoki Ishikawa JPN; Daan Van Cauwenberge BEL; Ruben Algoet BEL; Pavel Belkevich BLR; Polina Perova RUS; Frederico Cardoso PRT; Roberta Dell Pezzo ITA
2017	Rotterdam, Netherlands	Mor Divshi ISR Nóra Schultz HUN; Milan Milenović SRB	Mihnea Bâlici ROU Hrvoje Kožić HRV; Rosalie Looijaard NLD; Victor Mordhorst DNK; Álvaro Salgado Carranza ESP	Crista Erales GTM Arth Gupta IND; Kaarel Hänni EST; Michal Karlubik SVK; Konstantinos-Marios Konstantinou GRC	Karolina Bassa POL Tathagat Bhatia IND; Edoardo Calvello ITA; Reinis Cirpons LVA; Franciszek Cudek POL; Simon Derudder BEL; Danilo Djukanovic MNE; Laura Evers NLD; Martina Fridl SVN; Amanda Häkkinen FIN; Leonie Hong DEU; Matthias Verlinden BEL; Boris Janevski MKD; Lóránt Kiss HUN; Carolien Krekt NLD; Isaias Moser CHE; Baoyi Ni CHN; Antonio Piltcher BRA; Arkadiy Saakyan RUS; Vasilen Vasilev BGR; Ajuna Soerjadi NLD
2018	Bar, Montenegro	Radka Pallová CZE Amanda Häkkinen FIN; Michal Karlubik SVK	Yastika Guru IND Freja Værnskjold Dzougov DNK; Alvaro Lopes PRT	Martina Fridl SVN Yoshiyuki ISHIKAWA JPN; Sagnik Anupam IND; Mihail Larkov RUS; Daantje de Leur NLD	Luis Anngel Meza-Chavarría CRI Monique Murer BRA; Stefan Capmare ROU; Tzu Kit Chan MYS; Iulia Natalia Mitrache ROU; Gaeun KIM ROK; Martin Topić SRB; Meggy Michaud FRA; Tobias Heidenreich DEU; Terachet Rojrachsombat THA; Zhengyu Ging CHN; Maria Sara Fraser SRB; Paulina Kaczyńska POL; Javier Sanz González ESP; Paul Johannes Kalda EST; Thomas Valerio ITA; Valerija Baždar MNE
2019	Rome, Italy	Viktor Mršić HRV Kseniia Korotenko RUS	Yanying Lin CHN Manya Bansal IND; Bendik Sparre Hovet NOR; Kenneth Martin SVK	Noam Furman ISR Rei Yatsuhashi JPN; Tuomas Ville Santeri Ansio FIN; Duarte Lourenço Marcos Correia Amaro PRT; Marija Brašanac SRB; Tomaž Žgeč SVN; Mehmet Tüfek TUR
2020	Ljubljana, Slovenia	Aybars Önder TUR Wang Dingzheng SGP	Jiayi Ren SGP Faruk Šahat BIH; Luiz Felipe Horta BRA; Muhammad Amir Rafiq MYS	Blaž Sušnik SVN Dimitrios Kouvaras GRC; Rachel Börger DEU; Una Iza Grandovec SVN; Lyubomira Dimitrova BGR; Oskar Ban Brejc SVN; Deokhaeng Lee KOR; Thomas Delmas FRA	Anastasios Tsirigotis GRC Berkant Isaev BGR; Đorđije Petrović MNE; Elina Saarikoski FIN; Emanuel Krajnc SVN; Hana Ćatić BIH; Jean-Baptiste Bonneville LUX; Kristina Røstad Rosenvold NOR; Krištof Ocvirk SVN; Marcel Čarman SVN; Marton Vida HUN; Máté Héthelyi HUN; Matevž Rezman Tasič SVN; Paramott Bunnjaweht THA; Sara Novović MNE; Toma Gheorghe Tavares de Melo BRA; Younghoon Seo KOR; Yuto Koba JPN
2021	Ljubljana, Slovenia	Andrej Jovićević SRB Luiz Felipe Horta BRA	Jonathan Platzbecker DEU Paul Gruber AUT; Rin Kuroda JPN; Seoyoung Choi KOR	Yared Alemán CRI Ozan Ölmez TUR; Alexandra Khovrak UKR; Blaž Sušnik SVN; Džonatans Miks Melgalvis LVA; Máté Héthelyi HUN	Adian Roman FIN Ajna Ćuhara BIH; Aleksandra Savova BGR; Alon Loewenstein ISR; Aslak Hellevik NOR; Aurelie Fraichard ISR; Dimitrios Kouvaras GRC; Eirini Livieratou GRC; En Hao Lim SGP; Frederik Albl CZE; Giovanni Maria D’Antonio ITA; Kantanat Pridaphatrakun THA; Karl Abiline EST; Lena Wöß AUT; Muhammad Amir Rafiq M. Rafee MYS; Nitya Rajan CHE; Pongsapak Waiwitlikhit THA; Rick Wierenga NLD; Salomé Pierre FRA; Sara Tadic MNE; Tibet Şahin TUR; Usraat Fahmidah BGD; Yeonwoo Sung KOR; Yuhua Gao CHE
2022	Lisbon, Portugal	Giulia Pession ITA Tobias Willée GER	Aleksandra Savova BUL Nemes Lavinia LUX; Antoni Antoszek POL	Patrick Seyfried GER Ilana Raizler Gandin BRA; Sigve Wiedswang NOR; Jonatan Toporowski POL; Nate Triyananont THA	Aino Satu Kujari FIN Ana Ribeiro POR; Ana Wakabayashi BRA; Andrei-Nicolae Radu ROM; Andrija Iljukic SER; Carl Scandelius UK; Daniels Danilov LAT; Ellen Roper EST; Efraim Dahlén HUN; Giovanni D'Antonio ITA; Ivaylo Iliev Hristov BUL; Joost Ouweneel NLD; Josef Skolks CZE; Junichiro Ikeda JAP; Manyasiri Chotbun THA; Maria Barroso POR; María Díaz Ussía SPA; Maria-D Gheorghe ROM; Maša Kilibarda MNE; Md Emil Hafiznizam MYS; Mojca Ravnik SLO; Nahye Lee SKO; Noah Rosenbaum SWI; Nuno Espírito Santo POR; Oleksandra Khovrak UKR; Paul Kaspar Nurk EST; Pedro Silva POR; Pir Servan Tutsi TUR; Rita Brauna LAT; Sebastián A-Vargas CRI; Shiraz Medjahed FRA; Viktoria Knoll AUT
2023	Olympia, Greece	Dimitrije Golubovic SER Pietari Kaaro FIN	Marta Drelijowska POL Kenza Oughlane NLD Oskar Wienecke GER	Bogdan Dannen BUL Judah Kang SIN Myeongwoo Kang KOR Fabian Gydelund Møller DEN Ivan Petrić CRO Edwin Brattselius Thunfors SWE Jesko Veenema GER Inka Poikolainen FIN	Alberts Roze LAT Bui Gia Khanh Pham VIE Charles De Belloy De Saint Liénard USA Demosthenes Tserikis GRE Dimitrios Karavasilis GRE Ellen Marigold Roper EST Fernando Jose Mendez-Castellanos CRI Gabriella Vida Troen ISR Genta Takasu JAP Ivaylo Hristov BUL Jia Xin Teng MY Joseph Beritzki FRA Marie Necsa LUX Matus Lehocky BRA Mia Schwarcz AUT Mircea Balas ROM Muhsin Emir Karabag TUR Olga Kerameos GRE Róza Mária Zolnai HUN Siim Laane EST Stavros Soropoulos GRE Teodora Tikveshanska MKD Yannis Müller SWI Yejoon Lee KOR
2024	Helsinki, Finland	Jesko VeenemaGER Xu Ziyang CHN	Bernardo Guimarães Ferreira BRA Thew Sean Schoen MY Ventsislav Deyanov Velev BUL	Eetu Nikula FIN Harshit Gupta UAE Nutchayathoch Jeinthanuttkanont THA Otto Kapanen FIN Paweł Szlachciński POL	Aklan Larion HUN Akseli Pöllänen FIN Alexandra González Bermúdez CRI Aslan Kamadan FIN Ayesha Malik IND Danilo Janković MNE Dominyka Mauliūtė LIT Edoardo Grandicelli ITA Eeshan Sharma UAE Elias Mäkelä FIN Faris Rastoder BIH Gabriella Vida Troen ISR Georgios Kagiampakis GRE Hannibal Hilden Otte DEN Hermanni Somersalmi FIN Ilai Norani ISR Inka Poikolainen FIN Isabella Malou Holmgren DEN Katherina Strutzenberger AUT Lana Fontana CRO Laura Stevens FRA Leonhard Hasler LIE Matej Kasaić CRO Mats Jung LUX Menno Blommers NLD Miroslava Baricová SVK Nguyen Doan Duc Vinh VIE Onni Ojajärvi FIN Otto Birkoff SWE Petróczi Kíra Anna HUN Sarthak Kamalkishor Dhole IND Sehwan Park KOR Seungwon Spencer Park KOR Siravit Sriboonjareanchai THA Violeta Albinarrate ARG Xia Yujia CHN Yelyzaveta Khodieieva UKR Sacha Pierluigi FRA (IPO Logo Contest)
2025	Bari, Italy	Tae Yoon Song KOR Csanád Pozsgai POR	Noémie Turquin LUX Eva Švarcová CZ Filipa Lüthy CH Gustė Antanaitytė LIT	Viljami Viinamaki LUX Valentina Lucia Nilles ARG Valentin Nieva ARG Simone Gandini ITA Marit De Muer BEL Abyan Rizq Bin Abdul Halim MAS	Mira Antonia Ivanova AUT Roan De Ryker BEL Mateus Sperandio Mendonça BRA João Otávio Peri BRA Ventsislav Velev BUL Jiang Yanwei CHN Melissa Afanador González COL Sofia Pereira-Fernández CRC Christian Emil Otzen Kruse DEN Aleksander Nikitin EST Timofey Goshka EST Laurène Marie Isabelle Maury van Goch FRA Karla Köwing GER Marie-Madeleine Amiras GER Panagiotis Maximos Belos GRE Eirini Skandalaki GRE Arho Öövel HUN Gauri Gupta IND Emily D’Aloja ITA Mattia Vicario ITA Francesco Marsella ITA Massimiliano Ceolin ITA Riccardo Scarperi ITA Santiago Gaitán Zapata ITA Gaia Maria Plutino ITA Luigi Zurlo ITA Shoei Suzuki JAP Jin Yoon Je KOR Sofija Jansone LAT Leonhard Jakob Hasler LIE Sean Schoen Thew MAS Aldijan Bahovic MNE Danilo Jankovic MNE Olivier Kok NED Aukse Lekaviciute NOR Elias Wood Hegdal NOR Mira Musa Alrefaya PLE Piotr Mateusz Krzanowski POL Michal Piotr Wojewnik POL Vasco Lopes de Carvalho Leal POR Pedro Silva Reis POR Matei-David Serban ROU Kalina Pavlović SRB Samuel Peterec SVK Miroslava Baricova SVK Manca Kosir SLO Diego Sánchez Carro ESP Ali Ahmed Ali Turki SWE Alex Ström SWE Pakawat Poldetch THA Cemil Türk TUR Volodymyr Protsyshyn UKR Leonard Dushenkov Glozman USA Pham Bui Gia Khanh VIE
2026	Warsaw, Poland	Luis Emanuel Gómez Guzmán MEX Simeon Kardzhiev BUL Abhineshwari Narayanan SIN	Elliot Belmadani GER Ivan Stoilov BUL Afonso Tavares POR Isabella Giuseppina Tuzzeo ITA Amber Yap UK	Lucía Bortolus Rus ARG Sarthak Kamalkishor Dhole IND Jiyu Kim USA Rapolas Kukė LIT Vasco Leal POR Marta Marcinkiewicz POL Catalina Miranda Miralles MEX Parima Ua-arak THA	Jin-Woo Ahn KOR Praneeth Annapureddy USA Luka Azinovic CRO Isabel Barona Velásquez COL Andrea Bernáldez González-Rojas SPA Mathis Berthomieu FRA Uygar Denizel TUR Réka Ferdinandy HUN Mathis Grémy FRA Abyan Rizq Abdul Halim MY Danilo Janković MNE Klara Kaczmarek POL Raman Omed Kader NOR Yuna Kamewada JAP Eunseo Kim KOR Hajin Eden Kim ISR Matus Kovacic SVK Franciszek Jan Kreczmański POL Zhouchen Liu CHN David Mayr AUT Jiali Ni CHN Sławomir Ostrowski POL Jakub Piechaczek POL Teele Piibemann EST Isidora Popović SLO Dario Postolovski MKD Martin Riihimäki FIN Meghna Senthilkumar UAE Yevgeniya Shatokhina KAZ Louie Skougaard DEN Nina Sławek POL Hermanni Somersalmi FIN Saulė Staškevičiūtė LIT Alex Ström SWE Eva Švarcová CZ Áron Szarka HUN Iva Tomić SER Lavinia-Elena Vasiluță ROM Tymoteusz Wienke POL Michał Piotr Wojewnik POL Ayaan Wolvén SWE Hanson Yuan CAN Saken Zangar KAZ Pyrros Ziogas GRE Mario Rodríguez Bonnet SPA
