= International Olympiad on Astronomy and Astrophysics =

High school astronomy competition

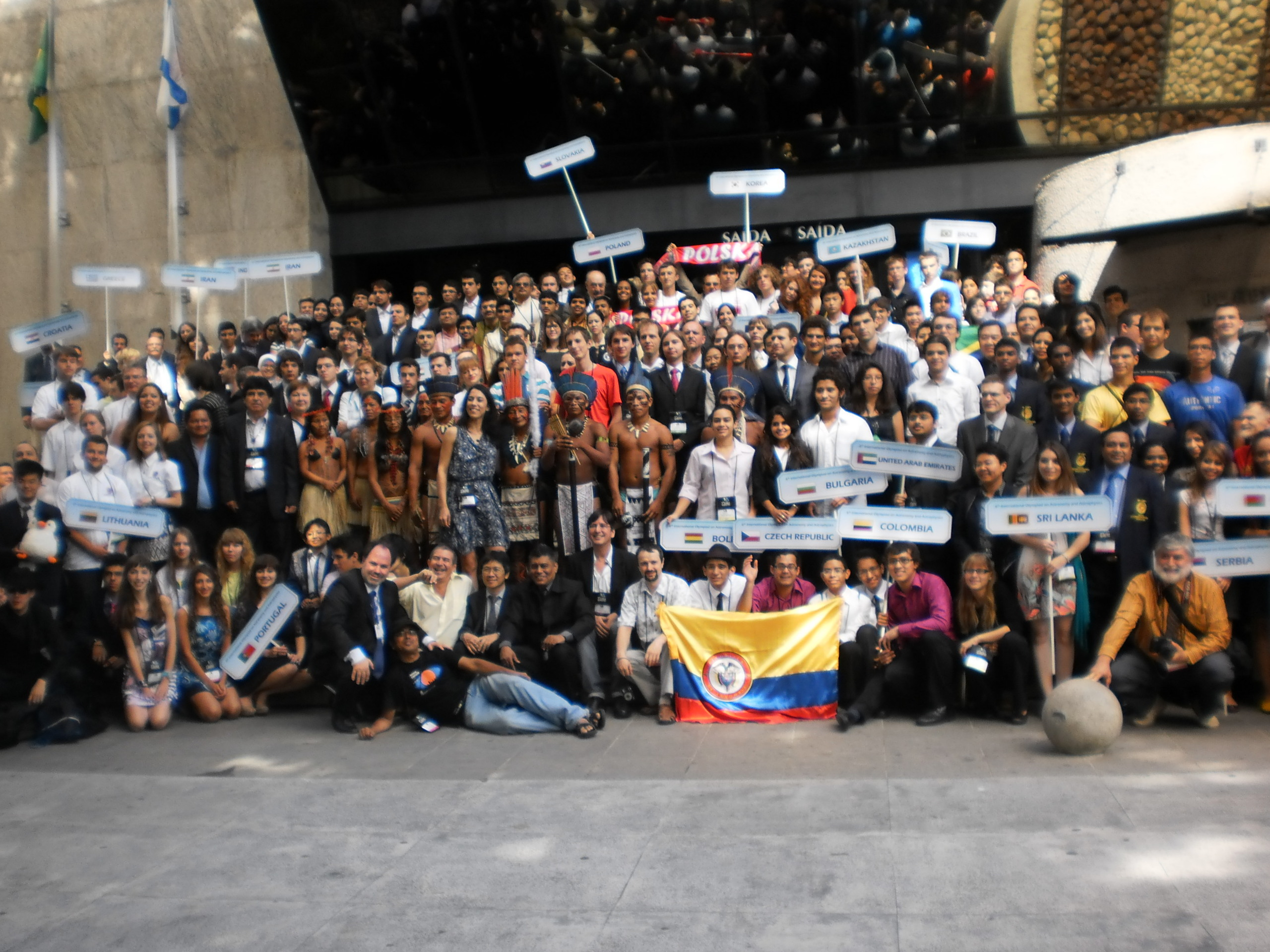
IOAA 2012 at Rio Planetarium, Rio de Janeiro, Brazil

The International Olympiad on Astronomy and Astrophysics (IOAA) is an annual astronomy and astrophysics competition for high school students, aimed to promote the growing interest in astronomy and related STEM subjects. It is one of the international science olympiads, and was founded from a dissidence inside the International Astronomy Olympiad, in order to increase the scope of the organization.

The IOAA consists of a theoretical exam, a data analysis exam, and an observational exam. A separate team competition is also included, where international teams are formed by randomly selecting members from different countries. The results of the team competition do not affect the individual results.

== History ==
The first IOAA was held in the city of Chiang Mai (Thailand) from November 30 to December 9, 2007. The International Council, consisting of team leaders, elected a president (Dr. Boonrucksar Soonthornthum, Thailand) and a secretary general (Dr. Chatief Kunjaya, Indonesia) for a five-year term.

The second Olympiad was held in 2008, from August 19 to 28, in the city of Bandung (Indonesia). It was attended by representatives of 22 countries.

The third Olympiad was held in 2009, from October 17 to 27, in Tehran. An observation tour was conducted in the desert. Representatives of 20 countries took part in the Olympiad.

The fourth Olympiad was held in 2010, from September 12 to September 21, in Beijing. 114 participants of the Olympiad came from 23 countries.

The fifth Olympiad was held in 2011, from August 25 to September 4, in the Polish cities of Katowice, Chorzów and Kraków. For the first time the Olympiad was held in Europe. Representatives of 26 countries took part in the Olympiad. In Poland, the International Council elected a new president (Dr. Chatief Kunjaya, Indonesia) and a secretary general (Dr. Greg Stachowski, Poland). Regional coordinators were also elected (Dr. Thaís Mothé Diniz, Brazil, for America and Dr. Aniket Sule, India, for Asia).

The sixth Olympiad was held in 2012, from August 4 to 13. For the first time the Olympiad was held in America in the Brazilian cities of Rio de Janeiro and Vassouras. Representatives of 28 countries took part in the Olympiad.

The seventh Olympiad was held in 2013, from July 27 to August 4 in the Greek city of Volos. The competition was attended by 39 teams from 35 countries, including for the first time teams from the USA, New Zealand, Canada, Malaysia, Armenia, the Republic of Macedonia and Cyprus.

The fourteenth Olympiad was supposed to be held in Bogotá, Colombia. However, due to the COVID-19 pandemic, the competition was moved to an online format and Colombia was moved to 2021. This competition was not named IOAA, but GeCAA (meaning Global e-Competition on Astronomy and Astrophysics) and did not count as the 14th IOAA. It was held 23 September 2020 to 23 October 2020. Estonia was the host country.

== Summary ==
Number	Year	Host country	Host city	Absolute winner	Countries Represented	Winner Team	Website
1	2007	Thailand	Chiang Mai	Thailand Suwun Suwunnarat	21		* 1st IOAA, 2007
2	2008	Indonesia	Bandung	India Nitin Jain	22		* 2nd IOAA, 2008
3	2009	Iran	Tehran	India Nitin Jain	20		* 3rd IOAA, 2009
4	2010	China	Beijing	Poland Przemysław Mróz	23		* 4th IOAA, 2010
5	2011	Poland	Chorzów / Katowice / Kraków	Czech Republic Stanislav Fořt	26		IOAA 2011
6	2012	Brazil	Rio de Janeiro / Vassouras	Lithuania Motiejus Valiūnas	28		IOAA 2012
7	2013	Greece	Volos	Romania Denis Turcu	35		* 7th IOAA, 2013
8	2014	Romania	Suceava / Gura Humorului	Romania Denis Turcu	42		
9	2015	Indonesia	Magelang / Semarang	Indonesia Joandy Leonata Pratama	41		
10	2016	India	Bhubaneswar	India Ameya Patwardhan	42		IOAA 2016
11	2017	Thailand	Phuket	Slovenia Aleksej Jurca	44		IOAA 2017
12	2018	China	Beijing	Russia Stanislav Tsapaev	39		IOAA 2018
13	2019	Hungary	Keszthely & Hévíz	Vietnam Quan Manh Nguyen	46		IOAA 2019
N/A (Note: Due to the COVID-19 pandemic, IOAA 2020 was replaced by an online competition: the Global e-Competition on Astronomy and Astrophysics (GeCAA).)	2020	Estonia (Note: The GeCAA was organized by the IOAA International Board with extensive support from the Estonian Astronomy Olympiad Committee.)	N/A	Canada Zhening Li	40	Canada	GeCAA
14	2021	Colombia	Bogotá (online)	Russia Maksim Permiakov	48	Russia	IOAA 2021
15	2022	Georgia	Kutaisi	Romania Vlad Ștefan Oros	45	Iran	IOAA 2022
16	2023	Poland	Chorzów / Katowice	Slovenia Peter Andolšek	52	United Kingdom	IOAA 2023
17	2024	Brazil	Vassouras	Slovenia Peter Andolšek	54	Iran	IOAA 2024
18	2025	India	Mumbai	United States Feodor Yevtushenko	64	India; Iran; United Kingdom	IOAA 2025
19	2026	Vietnam	Hanoi	Iran Hirbod Foudazi	64	Iran	IOAA 2026

The 1st IOAA-Jr, for the students under 16 years of age was held in Romania from 30 October to 7 November 2022. The 2nd IOAA-Jr was held in Volos, Greece from 24 to 30 September 2023, and its age restriction was lowered to students under 15(Absolute Winner: Chayapol Nontasut). The 3rd IOAA-Jr was hosted by Kathmandu, Nepal from 3 to 10 October 2024(Absolute Winner: Alex Faivre). The 4th IOAA-Jr was held in Piatra Neamț, Romania from 18 to 25 October 2025. The 5th IOAA-Jr will be held in Ubon Ratchathani, Thailand.

== Results ==
=== High-scoring participants ===
The following table lists multiple (triple and more) gold medal winners of IOAA with their ranks and corresponding years.

Name	Team(s)	Years			
Peter Andolšek	Slovenia	2021 (29th)	2022 (10th)	2023 (1st)	2024 (1st)
Stanislav Fořt	Czech Republic	2010 (8th)	2011 (1st)	2012 (2nd)	
Peter Kosec	Slovakia	2010 (5th)	2011 (4th)	2012 (5th)	
Daniil Dolgov	Russia	2016 (8th)	2017 (3rd)	2018 (11th)	
Jindřich Jelínek	Czech Republic	2016 (9th)	2018 (5th)	2019 (7th)	
Teo Kai Wen	Singapore	2023 (17th)	2024 (7th)	2025 (5th)	

Note: Several countries (e.g. India, Indonesia, Iran, Thailand) do not allow their students to contest in IOAA more than two times, even if they are eligible. Thus, statistics from those countries is not included in the table above.

== Bans ==
In 2022, the International Board of the IOAA decided to ban Russia and Belarus from future competitions due to their role in the conflict in Ukraine. Students from these countries can still join as "Individual Olympiad Participants".

In the 18th IOAA in 2025, the International Board voted by an overwhelming majority to similarly ban Israel due to its actions in Gaza. Israel has never participated in the IOAA, but it had expressed interest in the 18th IOAA, for which it did not complete registration.
