= Open International Geography Olympiad =

Geography knowledge competition for high school students founded in 2025

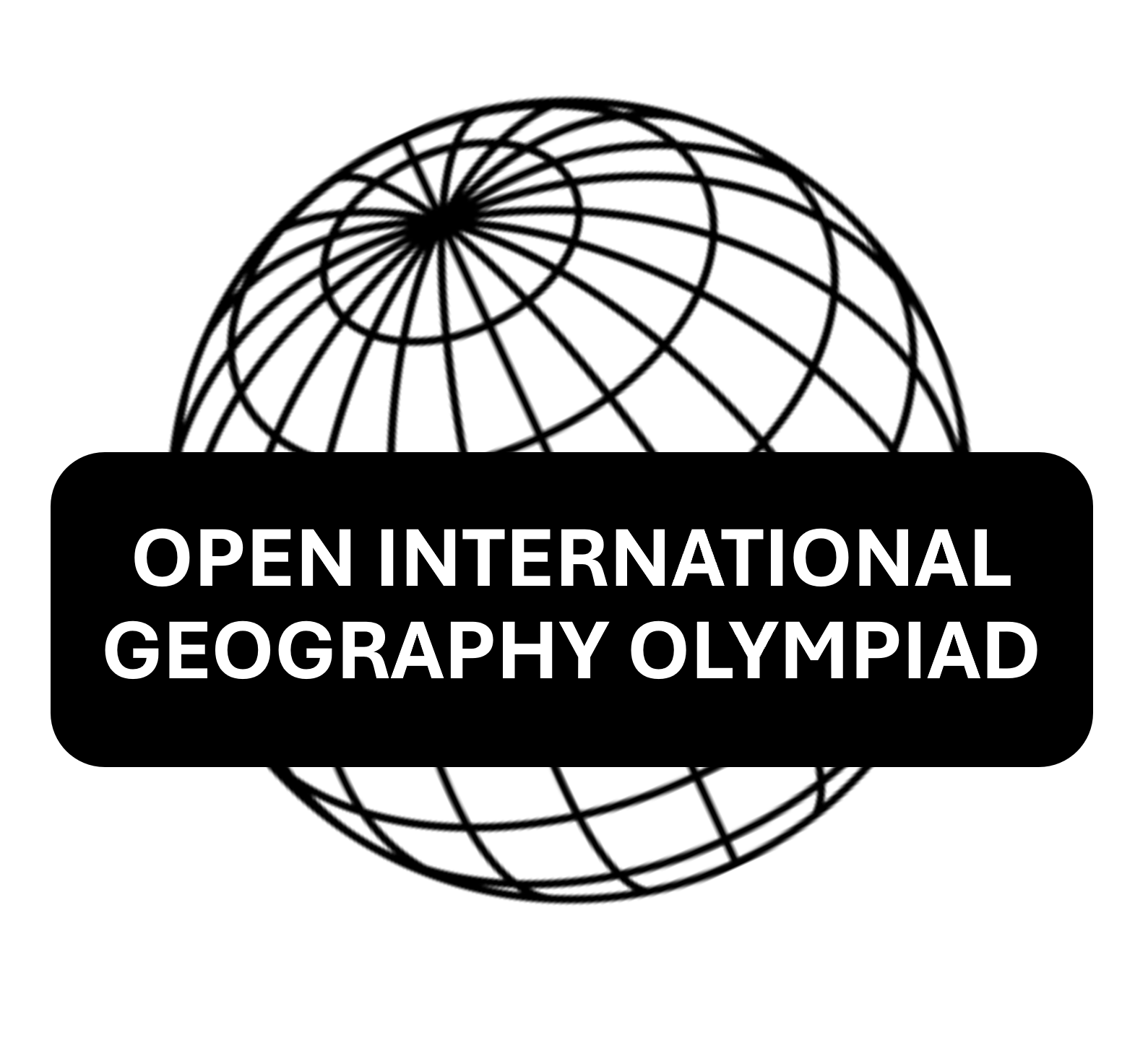
The logo of the Open International Geography Olympiad

Open International Geography Olympiad (openGeo) is an annual competition for 14 years of age or older geography high school students from all over the world. The openGeo Olympiad is held online. It is organised by Faculty of Geography at Lomonosov Moscow State University.

The Olympiad includes three rounds, following the structure of international geography olympiads:

- Written Response Test
- Practical and Mapping Exercise
- Multimedia Test

The openGeo Olympiad is recognised as the world’s largest online geography competition, with international recognition in many countries.

== Performances ==
	2025	2026
Number of countries	23	25
Number of participants	107	119

Team Ranking by Medals
	2025			2026		
National Team	Gold	Silver	Bronze	Gold	Silver	Bronze
Afghanistan	0	0	0	-	-	-
Armenia	0	2	3	0	3	1
Azerbaijan	0	0	0	0	1	2
Belarus	1	2	3	3	2	1
Bosnia and Herzegovina	0	0	0	-	-	-
Brazil	0	1	3	0	1	2
Brunei Darussalam	-	-	-	0	0	0
China Macau	0	0	1	-	-	-
Ghana	0	0	1	0	0	2
India	-	-	-	1	0	0
Indonesia	0	3	3	0	1	4
Iran	0	0	0	0	1	3
Kazakhstan	2	1	1	1	4	1
Kyrgyzstan	-	-	-	0	0	0
Malaysia	0	0	1	-	-	-
Mongolia	0	0	3	0	0	3
Montenegro	-	-	-	0	0	0
Mexico	-	-	-	0	0	0
Nigeria	0	0	1	0	0	0
Philippines	1	2	1	0	4	0
Russia	4	2	0	4	2	0
Serbia	0	3	2	0	1	3
Slovenia	0	0	1	0	0	1
Sri Lanka	0	0	0	-	-	-
Tajikistan	0	0	0	0	0	0
Thailand	1	0	4	1	1	3
Tunisia	0	0	0	-	-	-
Turkmenistan	-	-	-	0	0	0
Uganda	-	-	-	0	0	0
Uzbekistan	-	-	-	0	0	5
Zambia	0	0	0	-	-	-
