= Eurasian Astronomical Society =

Eurasian Astronomical Society (EAAS, Russian: Международная общественная организация "Астрономическое общество", romanized: mezhdunarodnaya obshchestvennaya organizatsiya "astronomicheskoe obshchestvo", lit. 'International societal organization "Astronomy society"') is a scientific society, comprising professional astronomers from various countries. It was founded in 1990 as a USSR Astronomical Society. The governing bodies are located in Moscow at the Sternberg Astronomical Institute.

== Founded by EAAS ==
- The International Astronomy Olympiad (since 1996)

== See also ==
- Members of the Eurasian Astronomical Society
- List of astronomical societies

== Sources ==
- Кононович, Э.В.; Бочкарев, Н.Г. (2002). "Астрономические общества в России". Heliophysics, Internal structure and seismology (in Russian). Moscow State University.
