= List of National Taiwan Normal University alumni =

Following is a list of notable alumni of the National Taiwan Normal University.

== Academia ==
=== Presidents ===
- Dian-mo Cai – former president of National Taitung University
- Choong Kam-kow – president of Malaysian Institute of Art and dean of the School of Fine Art at LASALLE College of the Arts
- Chung Bum-Jin – former president of Sungkyunkwan University
- Hsu Kuang-piao – president of National Taiwan University of Sport
- Kuo Wei-fan – former president of National Taiwan Normal University and Minister of the Ministry of Education (Taiwan)
- Wen-Hwa Lee – molecular biologist and former president of China Medical University
- Jian-xing Li – first president of National Taipei University and Vice Minister of the Ministry of Education (Taiwan)
- Jin-zhen Li – first president of National Quemoy University
- Lin Ching-chiang – president of National Chung Cheng University and Minister of the Ministry of Education (Taiwan)
- Lin Man-houng – historian and the first woman president of the Academia Historica
- Tai Hsia-ling – president of the University of Taipei and former Minister for the Sports Affairs Council
- Cheng-Chih Wu – president of National Taiwan Normal University
- Wu Lien-shang – former president of National Kaohsiung Normal University
- Wu Tieh-hsiung – president of National University of Tainan and former Vice Minister of the Ministry of Education (Taiwan)
- Yang Hung-duen – president of National Sun Yet-sen University and Minister of the National Science and Technology Council (Taiwan)

=== Professors ===
- Ang Ui-jin – chief architect of the Taiwanese Language Phonetic Alphabet and dean and professor at the National Taichung University
- Chang Chun-Yen – science education scholar
- Chang Yu-fa – historian and director of Academia Sinica Institute of Modern History
- Chen Den-wu – historian and director of the Center for General Education at National Taiwan Normal University
- Chih-Ta Chia – dean of the College of Science at National Taiwan Normal University
- Chuang Chi-fa – historian and teacher at Tamkang University, Soochow University, National Taiwan Normal University, and National Chengchi University
- Gong Hwang-cherng – linguist and professor at Academia Sinica
- C.-T. James Huang – generative linguist ad professor at Harvard University
- Jackson Sun – linguist and chair professor at the Department of English at National Taiwan Normal University
- Lee Fong-mao – emeritus chair professor at National Chengchi University
- Li Jen-kuei – linguist and research fellow at the Institute of Linguistics, Academia Sinica
- James C. P. Liang – professor of Oriental studies at the University of Pennsylvania and former vice president of Leiden University
- Shu-mei Shih – scholar, literary theorist, and professor at University of California, Los Angeles
- Tung-Tai Lin – a professor at the Graduate Institute of Mass Communication at National Taiwan Normal University
- Wang Ming-ke – historian and professor
- Shen-keng Yang – National Chair Professor and dean of the College of Education, National Chung Cheng University

== Art ==
- Chen Chi-nan – former director of National Palace Museum and former chairperson of Taiwan Council for Cultural Affairs
- Han Hsiang-ning – artist
- Huang Kuang-nan – former director of the National Museum of History and the president of National Taiwan University of Arts
- Li Kuen-pei, artist
- Lin Jeng-yi – former director of National Palace Museum
- Lin Mun-lee – art scholar and former director of National Palace Museum
- Liu Guosong – practitionist of modernist Chinese painting
- Liu Yong – painter and essayist
- Tong Yang-tze – calligrapher
- Martino Yu – singer and artist

== Entertainment ==
- Chen Ya-lan – Taiwanese opera performer and winner of Best Actor at Golden Bell Awards
- Li Hsing – film director
- Uğur Rıfat Karlova – stand-up comedian
- Fan-Long Ko – composer
- Selina Jen – member of the girl group S.H.E
- Shara Lin – actress
- Wilbur Lin, conductor of the Missouri Symphony
- Lorene Ren – actress
- Evan Yo –Mandopop singer

== Law ==
- Chang Li-shan – the magistrate of Yunlin County and member of the Legislative Yuan
- Lee Chu-feng – Magistrate of Kinmen County
- Wong Chin-chu – former Magistrate of Changhua County and former chairperson of Council for Cultural Affairs
- April Yao – the magistrate of Taitung County

== Literature ==
- Chong Yee-Voon – writer
- Ma Sen – writer
- Xi Murong – poet and painter
- Wai-lim Yip – poet

== Politics ==
- Chang Shao-hsi – former chairperson of the Sports Administration, Ministry of Education (Taiwan) and professor at the National Taiwan Normal University
- Chen Kuei-miao – member of the Legislative Yuan
- Hsu Shui-teh – Minister of Ministry of the Interior (Taiwan)
- Hua Chia-chih – first chief of the Council of Indigenous Peoples
- Huang Kun-huei – Minister of the Ministry of the Interior (Taiwan) and chairman of Taiwan Solidarity Union
- Huang Min-hui – vice chairperson of Kuomintang and the Mayor of Chiayi City
- Kuo Wei-fan – Minister of the Ministry of Education (Taiwan) and former president of National Taiwan Normal University
- Lin Ching-chiang – Minister of the Ministry of Education (Taiwan) and president of National Chung Cheng University
- Pan Wen-chung – Minister of the Ministry of Education (Taiwan)
- Peng Wan-ru – director of the Democratic Progressive Party's (DPP) Women's Affairs Department
- Wang Jin-pyng – president of the Legislative Yuan
- Wang Tuoh – former secretary-general of Democratic Progressive Party
- Wu Ching-ji – Minister of the Ministry of Education (Taiwan)
- Yang Chao-hsiang – Minister of the Ministry of Education (Taiwan) and Minister of the Ministry of Examination
- Yang Chih-liang – Minister of the Department of Health of the Executive Yuan
- Yaung Chih-liang – 13th Minister of the Taiwanese Ministry of Health and Welfare (Taiwan)
- Zhang Kehui – former Vice Chairman of the Chinese People's Political Consultative Conference
- Li Yuan – Minister of the Ministry of Culture (Taiwan)

== Science and technology ==
- Aja Huang – computer scientist and member of the AlphaGo project
- Eva Y.-H.P. Lee – molecular biologist
- Ming-Chang Lin – chemist
- Wen-Hwa Lee – molecular biologist and former president of China Medical University

== Sports ==
- Chen Hung-ling – badminton player
- Cheng Shao-chieh – badminton player
- Chi Shu-ju – Taekwondo practitioner and Olympic medalist
- Chien Yu-chin – badminton player
- Hsieh Chang-heng – baseball player in the CPBL
- Ku Chin-shui – aboriginal athlete
- Le Chien-Ying – archer
- Lu Yen-hsun – professional tennis player
- Su I-Chieh – professional basketball player
- Tien Lei – basketball player
- Tseng Shu-o – professional soccer player in Australia
- Yuan Shu-chi – archer
- Tang Chia-hung – artistic gymnast
