= Chris King (geologist) =

Lecturer in Geosciences

- Born: Christopher John Henry King; 19 December 1949; Bournemouth, England, U.K.
- Died: 17 February 2022 (aged 72)
- Occupations: Geologist; Lecturer in Geosciences

Christopher John Henry King (1949–2022) was a prominent British geologist and science educator known for his extensive work in geoscience education including contributions to international organizations like the International Union of Geological Sciences (IUGS) and the International Geoscience Education Organization (IGEO) and the European Geosciences Union.

== Early life and education ==
King was born on 19 December 1949 in Bournemouth, England. He received a bachelor's degree in geology at the University of Bristol. In 1971, he began a more than five-year career as a diamond prospector for De Beers company in South Africa, Swaziland, and Australia.

Afterwards, he obtained a master's degree with distinction in sedimentology from the University of Reading and completed a Postgraduate Certificate in Education (PGCE) in science and geology at Keele University under the tutelage of David Barnard Thompson.

== Career in geoscience education ==
King began his career as a geoscience educator at the Altrincham Grammar School for Boys from 1978 to 1996, where he taught Geology A-Level and other science subjects. He became a Science Education Lecturer at Keele University in 1996, and was promoted to Professor of Earth Science Education there in 2006. He served as Head of the Keele University Department of Education for two years. King was also a founder, director, and driving force behind the Earth Science Education Unit (ESEU) at Keele University, which was active from 2002 to 2015. ESEU provided professional development workshops for Earth science teachers within the United Kingdom. It educated more than 30,000 teachers on Earth science topics. King retired from Keele in December 2015 and was thereafter awarded Professor Emeritus status. He died on 17 February 2022, aged 72.

King's contributions to global geoscience education were numerous. He helped organize the first International Conference in Geoscience Education. He was a founder member of the International Geoscience Education Organization (IGEO) and its first Chairman in 2000. He remained a Council Member until 2012. He was a founding member of the Commission on Geoscience Education (COGE) within the International Union of Geological Sciences (IUGS).

In 2007, he became a founder of the Earth Learning Idea (ELI), website which freely provides regularly updated geoscience-focused activities for teachers and informal educators in ten languages. According to The Geological Society, their content has been downloaded over 5.7 million times since the effort began.

== Awards and honors ==
King is widely recognized for his contributions to geoscience education and has received numerous awards including:

- 1994 Life Membership of ESTA
- 2003 Geological Society’s Distinguished Service Award
- 2011 RH Worth Prize
- 2012 Geologists’ Association’s Halstead Medal
- 2018 Geoethics Medal from the International Association for the Promotion of Geoethics (IAPG)

In 2023, IUGS-COGE created the Chris King Medal to honor his contributions to global geoscience education. The medal is awarded biannually to an educator who has demonstrated an impactful career in geoscience education.

== Legacy ==
King's substantial imprint on geoscience education is epitomized by his significant literary contributions. He co-authored more than 200 publications, including several textbooks and resources on Earth science education as well as peer-reviewed journal articles.

As a member of COGE and the Chairman of the Education Committee of the European Geosciences Union (EGU) in 2018, King played a pivotal role in the establishment of the Geoscience Education Field Officer Programme (GEFO) and the International Geoscience Syllabus.

The GEFO program was initiated following Professor King's comprehensive Geoscience Education Across the Globe survey, which highlights the need for proper training for geoscience educators. In 2018, King garnered the support of IUGS and EGU to formally launch the program, leading to the appointment and training of Geoscience Education Field Officers. He oversaw the program until 2021. The primary aim of the program is to address the growing devaluation of geoscience teaching and to propose innovative pedagogical approaches for non-higher education. Since its inception, the program has involved more than 400 teachers, including 120 Portuguese, in various initiatives aimed at proposing pedagogical strategies and creative training for teachers in this field. As such, the GEFO program contributes to the advancement of geoscience education on a global scale.

King's works, including pivotal publications like the E-book, "Exploring Geoscience Across the Globe translated into 7 languages, are used in geoscience education around the world.

== Selected publications ==
King co-authored more than 200 publications, including several textbooks and resources on Earth science education as well as thirty peer-reviewed journal articles.

- King, C. (2008). Geoscience education: an overview. Studies in Science Education, 44(2), 187–222. Geoscience education: an overview
- King, C. (2010). An analysis of misconceptions in science textbooks: Earth science in England and Wales. International Journal of Science Education, 32(5), 565–601. An Analysis of Misconceptions in Science Textbooks: Earth science in England and Wales
- King, C. (2013). Geoscience education across the globe–results of the IUGS-COGE/IGEO survey. Episodes Journal of International Geoscience, 36(1), 19–30. Geoscience education across the globe – results of the IUGS-COGE/IGEO survey
- King, C., Kennett, P., & Devon, E. (2013). Earthlearningidea: A Worldwide Web–Based Resource of Simple but Effective Teaching Activities. Journal of Geoscience Education, 61(1), 37–52. Earthlearningidea: A Worldwide Web–Based Resource of Simple but Effective Teaching Activities
- King, C. (2016). Fostering deep understanding through the use of geoscience investigations, models and thought experiments: The earth science education unit and Earthlearningidea experiences. In Geoscience education: Indoor and outdoor (pp. 3-23). Cham: Springer International Publishing. Geoscience Education: Indoor and Outdoor
- King, C. J. (2019). What Pattern of Progression in Geoscience Fieldwork can be Recognised by Geoscience Educators?. Geosciences, 9(5), 192. What Pattern of Progression in Geoscience Fieldwork can be Recognised by Geoscience Educators?
- King, C., Gorfinkiel, D., & Frick, M. (2021). International comparisons of school-level geoscience education–the UNESCO/IGEO expert opinion survey. International Journal of Science Education, 43(1), 56–78. International comparisons of school-level geoscience education– the UNESCO/IGEO expert opinion survey
