= Komen Brinker Award for Scientific Distinction =

Biology and medicine award

The Komen Brinker Award for Scientific Distinction was established by Susan G. Komen for the Cure in 1992 to recognize leading scientists for their significant work in advancing research concepts or clinical application in the fields of breast cancer research, screening or treatment.

The intent of the award is to recognize scholars for a specific contribution, a consistent pattern of contributions, or leadership in the field that has had a substantial impact on the fight against breast cancer. The awardees are nominated and selected by a panel of their peers. Recipients are also invited to present their work in a lecture at the annual San Antonio Breast Cancer Symposium (SABCS). Brinker Award recipients each receive a $20,000 honorarium and a special citation of this distinction.

== Recipients ==
Past recipients of the Komen Brinker Award for Scientific Distinction include

- V. Craig Jordan (1992), a pioneer in the use of tamoxifen
- Bernard Fisher (1992)
- Arnold J. Levine (1993)
- Richard J. Santen (1993)
- Marc Lippman (1994)
- Malcolm C. Pike (1994)
- C. Kent Osborne (1995)
- Helene S. Smith (1995)
- Edison Liu (1996)
- Umberto Veronesi (1996)
- Gabriel Hortobagyi (1997)
- David M. Livingston (1997)
- Leland Hartwell (1998), winner of the 2001 Nobel Prize for medicine or physiology who was recognized for his achievements in the understanding the cell cycle in the development of cancer
- Henry T. Lynch (1998)
- Mary-Claire King (1999), whose research isolated the BRCA1 and BRCA2 gene mutations associated with genetic forms of breast cancer
- Nancy E. Davidson (1999)
- Angela Brodie (2000)
- Dimitrios Trichopoulos (2000)
- Jay R. Harris (2001)
- Bert W. O'Malley (2001)
- Elwood V. Jensen (2002)
- Charles L. Loprinzi (2002)
- Mina J. Bissell (2003)
- Walter C. Willett (2003)
- Daniel Medina (2004)
- Larry Norton, M.D. (2004), whose dose-density approach to the administration of chemotherapy has revolutionized breast cancer treatment
- Trevor J. Powles (2005)
- Anita Roberts (2005), who co-discovered the TGF-beta molecule
- Evan Simpson (2006)
- George W. Sledge Jr. (2006)
- Leslie Bernstein (2007)
- Joe W. Gray (2007)
- Richard D. Gelber (2008)
- Aron Goldhirsch (2008)
- Patricia S. Steeg (2008)
- Benita S. Katzenellenbogan (2009) of the University of Illinois, for her work on the role of estrogen receptors in breast cancer
- Geoffrey Greene (2009)
- Ian Smith (2009)
- Jeffrey M. Rosen (2010)
- Soonmyung Paik (2010)
- Carlos L. Arteaga (2011), whose research has helped in explaining the role of key growth factor receptors and proteins in breast cancer pathogenesis
- Armando E. Giuliano (2011)
- Yosef Yarden (2012)
- Hyman B. Muss (2012)
- Edith A. Perez (2013)
- Gordon B. Mills (2013)
- Mitchell Dowsett (2014), Royal Marsden Hospital
- Joan Brugge (2014), Harvard Medical School
- Myles Brown (2015)
- Martine J. Piccart (2015)
- Charles Perou (2016)
- Monica Morrow (2016)
- Alan Ashworth (2017)
- Dennis Slamon (2017)
- Lisa M. Coussens (2018)
- Eric Winer (2018)
- Matthew J. Ellis (2019)
- Jane Visvader (2019)
- Geoffrey Lindeman (2019)

== See also ==
- List of biomedical science awards
