= Hector Luis Lacreu =

Argentinian geologist and professor

Héctor Luis Lacreu (born in Buenos Aires, Palomar, Argentina, on July 15, 1950) is an Argentinian geologist and professor (retired), awarded the Chris King Medal for his innovative contributions to the teaching of geosciences at the university level and for helping develop a national geoscience curriculum in Argentina. He founded the Natural History Museum at the National University of San Luis (UNSL) in 1997, served as its curator for nine years, and is also an advocate for Argentina's geological heritage.

== Education and teaching career ==
Lacreu obtained a bachelor's degree in geological sciences by the Buenos Aires University (UBA) in 1974. From 1975 to 1979, he worked as a geologist mining uranium for the Argentinian government at National Atomic Energy Commission in Salta. Still, he had to leave due to political threats during the military dictatorship (1976–1983). From 1979 to 1986, he worked in the exploration and mining of alabaster (sometimes described as calcareous onyx).

Starting in 1983, Lacreu became a professor and researcher in theDepartment of Geology at the UNSL. He completed his research on a genesis theory for Geological Sciences at UNSL, earning a Ph.D. in 1993. After participating in a geology education conference in Spain in 1994, Lacreu dedicated primarily to teaching geology and referred to himself as a "Geolodacta". For over 20 years, he taught the course "Introduction to Geology" at UNSL and obtained a Specialist in University Teaching in 1999. Lacreu served in various leadership roles and governing boards at UNSL, including being the Academic Secretary of the Faculty of Physical, Mathematical, and Natural Sciences (1986–1988), the Academic Secretary of the National University (1998–2001), and the Director of the Department of Geology (2007–2011). He was known for teaching innovative undergraduate and postgraduate courses, including "Geological Practice", Geological Practice and Citizenship, “History of Geological Landscapes”, and “Geolodactics: Reflections for the Renewal of Geological Literacy”.

Lacreu has published over 50 papers, several books on geoscience education in Spanish, and 25 research articles on alabaster. The majority of these works are available on open-access platforms. In December 2015, he had earned the rank of full-time lecturer.

== National and international contributions ==
In addition to his work at UNSL, Lacreu significantly contributed to geoscience education in Argentina. As a consultant for the Ministry of Culture and Education, from 1994 to 1996, he played a role in the development of the Teacher Training Program and the Basic Common Curriculum for Primary and Secondary Education and Teacher Training. From 2002 to 2003, he coordinated the UNSL team in the ACES Network (Curricular Environmentalization of Higher Education) as part of the Latin America Academic Formation Program of the European Commission. He also contributed to the development of Earth Sciences curriculum designs in the provinces of Buenos Aires (2010), Córdoba (2011), La Pampa (2013), and San Luis. In 2011, he worked with the National Commission on Evaluation and Accreditation as a member of the National Committee for the Evaluation of Geology Programs. He coordinated the Pre-University Teaching Commission of the Association of Geological Faculties of Argentina (2013–2015).

Internationally, Lacreu conducted Teacher Training Workshops on "Geological History of the Landscape" in Caracas, Venezuela (2006), Campinas, Brazil (2007–2009), Córdoba, Argentina (2008), and Huelva, Spain (2012), and was invited speaker in conferences organized by the Latin American Chapter of the International Geoscience Education Organization (IGEO).

== Social commitment ==
Throughout his career, Lacreu has led numerous initiatives to make the geological sciences accessible to the public. His proposal for the Geosite "Salamanca gap" in 2023 showcases his dedication to geological heritage. In 1996, he founded Learning about the Planet a university extension project that extends geological literacy through dynamic programs. Lacreu founded the Natural History Museum at the Universidad Nacional de San Luis in 1997 and served as its curator for 9 years. His 'Geolodacta' YouTube channel offers talks on diverse geological topics.

During his professional journey, Dr. Lacreu has applied his knowledge and skills in geoscience to support and promote environmental causes. He signed a lawsuit called 'Citizens Assembly for Vulpiani vs. Government of the province of San Luis' and the "Pollute and Pay" initiative in 2023. The purpose of this lawsuit, and similar ones involving Lacreu, was to collectively address environmental harm. He advocates for sustainability through writing blogs and delivering radio and social media interviews. His projects include creating the Geolodactica blog in 2015 and the Citizen Geology blog in 2023. His teaching efforts include open courses such as the Geological Landscape course and mentoring the future generation of geoscientist. Lacreu is also featured in podcasts focused on geoheritage and historical and modern societal connections to the landscape, launched by the Universidad Nacional de San Luis.

== Memberships and awards ==
Lacreu is a co-founding member of the Latin American Chapter of the IGEO. He is also a co-founding member of the Geoscience Educators Network of Argentina (REDCITIA).

He is a member of the scientific/editorial committee of the Journal of the Association for Teaching Earth Sciences, also known as Terrea Didatica published by Unicamp (Brazil), and the journal Topics in Biology and Geology of the NOA published by the Bio and Geosciences Institute of the NOA, Argentina.

In 2017, Lacreu was awarded the "Juan José Nágera" Award for the promotion of Geology in Argentina, presented by the Geological Association of Argentina.

In 2023, Lacreu was awarded the Chris King Medal, by the Commission on Geoscience Education of the International Union of Geological Sciences.

== Selected publications ==
Lacreu published a number of papers on different geological subjects, including:

- Lacreu, Héctor L. 2021 “Construction and relevance of geolodactics”. Terræ Didatica, núm. 17: 1–6, (in Spanish)
- Lacreu, Héctor L. 2019 “Geolodactics, challenges for renewing geology teaching” Terræ Didatica, núm. 15, pp. 1–11. (in Spanish)
- Lacreu, Héctor L. 2017. “The geological landscape in geoscience education: Is it a teaching resource, an object of study or both?”. Enseñanza de las Ciencias de la Tierra, 25.3., p. 310-318, (in Spanish)
- Lacreu, Hector L. 2012. “Political roots of scientific illiteracy”. XVII Simposio sobre enseñanza de la Geología Actas 91–99, Huelva, España. (in Spanish)
- Lacreu, Hector L. 2008. “Geo-environmental Resources and Citizenship". Térrea Didatica 4.1 pp 43:50, Campinas, (in Spanish) Brasil
- Lacreu, H. L. 2007. "Epistemological reflections on the change of genetic model for calcareous onyxes". Revista de la Asociación Geológica Argentina, 62(1), 76–85. (in Spanish)
- Lacreu, H.L., 1999. Geocentric Perspective for Environmental Education. Alternativas Año IV N°17:143-166, (in Spanish)
- Lacreu, H.L. 1997 “Didactic transposition of the Geosciences”. Enseñanza de las Ciencias de la Tierra, vol 5, num 1, junio de 1997, pag 37- 48, (in Spanish)
- Lacreu, H.L. 1997 “Transforming the rocks (Simulations with an analogue model)”. Enseñanza de las Ciencias de la Tierra, vol 5, num 2, septiembre de 1997, pag 124- 130, I.S.S.N.: 1132–9157, (in Spanish)
