= Geoscience Education, Training and Technology Transfer =

Commission on Geoscience Education (COGE)
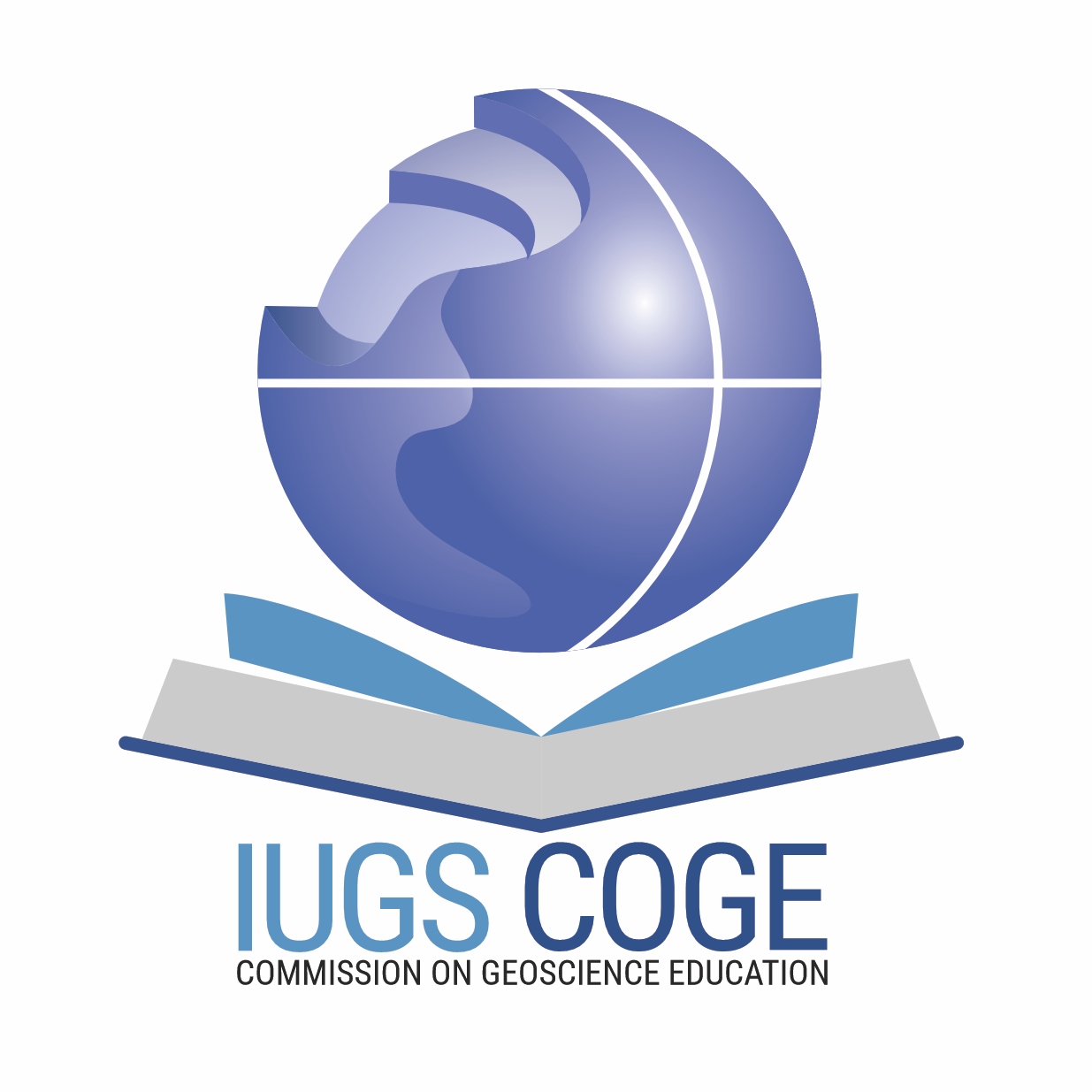
- Formation: 2004; 22 years ago
- Purpose: Education
- Headquarters: Australia
- Region served: Worldwide
- Board Chair: Sandra Paula Villacorta Chambi
- Board of directors: Sandra Paula Villacorta Chambi (Chair) Ramanathan Baskar (Compliance Advisor) Elvaene James (General Secretary and Treasure)
- Website: https://iugscoge.org/

The 'Commission on Geoscience Education (COGE), is a global organization operating under the International Union of Geological Sciences (IUGS). It aims to contribute to global efforts towards the advancement of geoscience education and the promotion of global knowledge and technology transfer in this field.

== Description ==
COGE was initially established in 1990 as the Commission on Geoscience Education, Training, and Technology Transfer with the mission to enhance the quality of geoscience education worldwide through collaboration with global organisations, including the International Geoscience Education Organization (IGEO) and the European Geosciences Union (EGU), to promote geoscience education and training initiatives around the globe. It was restructured and rebranded as COGE in 2004 to reflect a focused commitment to Earth science education and professional development.

COGE aims to support both developed and developing countries in strengthening geoscience education through capacity building, outreach, and curriculum development. Among its most impactful initiatives is the Geoscience Education Field Officers (GEFO) Programme, which trains educators globally to promote geosciences at the secondary and tertiary levels.

The commission collaborates with international organisations, including the European Geosciences Union (EGU) Education Committee, with which it has a formal cooperation agreement. These collaborations support the co-development of educational resources such as the International Geoscience Curriculum and contributions to initiatives including GeoSciEd conferences and the International Earth Science Olympiad (IESO), organised by IGEO.

Since its reestructuration in 2023, achievements include the establishment of the Chris King Medal, awarded biennially to recognize outstanding educators in geoscience, and the publication of educational materials such as Geoscience Education Over the World. Through its global network, COGE continues to champion inclusive, innovative, and geoethically grounded approaches to Earth science education.

In 2024, COGE continued to expand its global reach, welcoming new members from Ghana, Colombia, Bolivia, and Nigeria. The commission updated its Terms of Reference and enhanced the GEFO Programme, focusing on Africa and South America to amplify the impact of field officers and promote geoscience education internationally.

== Current organization ==
The current structure of COGE comprises 23 members from 22 countries, including a governing Board, four thematic sub-commissions, and five committees. The current board of the commission is formed by members representing Asia (Elvaene James), Asia (Ramanathan Baskar), and South America (Sandra Villacorta). The COGE subcommissions were established in 2023, and coordinate efforts in the following thematic areas:

- Equity, Diversity and Inclusion, for strategies for an equitable participation and inclusive practices within COGE initiatives.
- International Relations, manages institutional partnerships and facilitates cross-border collaboration and external funding opportunities.
- Education, Outreach and Policy which focuses on public engagement in geoscience education through events and communication activities. It oversees the coordination of initiatives including the Geoscience Field Officers (GEFO) programme, the GeoArt project, and awareness campaigns delivered through workshops and training.

In addition, five standing committees, created in 2022, support COGE’s operational and strategic goals:

- Finances, prepares annual budgets and funding proposals aligned with the commission’s work plan.
- Awards, administers the selection process for distinctions such as the Chris King Medal.
- Publications, coordinates the production of educational materials and scholarly outputs.
- Governance and Membership, oversees recruitment, retention, and global representation of members.
- Social Media and Communication, manages digital communications, including social platforms and outreach content.

As of 2024, COGE includes members from 21 countries across six continents, ensuring wide geographic representation and diverse perspectives in its governance and activities.

== Programs and initiatives ==
Since its establishment in 2004, the Commission has developed and supported international programmes aimed at strengthening Earth science education and the professional development of geoscience educators. In 2024, the IIUGS elected a new Executive Committee, with increased global representation, including members from Africa, Latin America and Asia. Since then, COGE programmes have increasingly focused on regions where Earth science is underrepresented in national curricula.

One of the Commission’s initiatives is the Geoscience Field Officers (GEFO) programme, launched in 2018 in collaboration with the European Geosciences Union. The programme was developed by Chris King to support the training of educators delivering geoscience workshops, particularly in regions with limited access to Earth science education. It makes use of open-access resources such as Earth Learning Idea and promotes field-based and interactive teaching approaches. Since 2022, COGE has coordinated activities in non-European regions, while EGU has continued to oversee the European branch.

In 2023, the Chris King Medal for Excellence in Geoscience Education was established to recognise contributions to geoscience education. The award is presented biennially to individuals with sustained contributions at national and international levels. The inaugural recipient was Héctor Lacreu in 2023, followed by Amelia Calonge in 2025.

The Commission has also contributed to the development of educational resources and curriculum frameworks. These include support for the publication of Exploring Geoscience Across the Globe (2019) and involvement in the development of the International Geoscience Curriculum in collaboration with the IGEO. In 2024, a number of papers were published in a special issue of Episodes and in the Teaching and Communication of Geosciences journal, the latter developed in collaboration with the National Autonomous University of Mexico (UNAM).

In addition, COGE organises sessions and town hall meetings at international conferences, including the AGU Fall Meeting and the International Geological Congress. It also supports the organisation of webinars and dissemination of educational materials, including multilingual resources, through collaborations with institutions such as the Geosciences Centre of UNAM (CGEO), Women in Earth and Environmental Sciences in Australasia and the IAEG Peruvian Section.

=== Social media and outreach ===
In 2022, COGE established a Social Media Committee to strengthen its online presence, promote global engagement, and increase visibility of its projects and programmes. The committee manages COGE’s presence across major platforms including Instagram, Facebook, and X (previously known as Twitter), LinkedIn, and the official website. A study presented at the AGU Fall Meeting 2023 analyzed user interaction with COGE’s digital content and showed that the most engaging topics involve the GEFO Programme, the Chris King Medal, international collaborations, and educational publications. The study also highlighted the importance of multilingual and interactive content in reaching a global audience. By 2024, the committee amplified the commission's outreach, including webinars on geoscience education hosted in collaboration with the Public Outreach and Communication Subcommission, now available on COGE's YouTube channel. The Social Media Team launched the Geoscience Educator of the Month campaign to recognize outstanding geoeducators worldwide, highlighting two geoscientist from Latin America.
