= Wen-Hwa Lee =

Taiwanese molecular biologist (born 1950)

Wen-Hwa Lee (Chinese: 李文華; born 1 June 1950) is a Taiwanese molecular biologist.

== Education and career ==
Lee earned his bachelor's degree from National Taiwan Normal University, master's degrees from National Taiwan University, then completed a doctorate at the University of California, Berkeley, in 1981. Lee began his teaching career at the University of California, San Diego in 1984, as an assistant professor, and was promoted to associate professor in 1990. Between 1991 and 2003, he was a member of the University of Texas Health Science Center at San Antonio, serving as Alice P. McDermott Distinguished University Chair. Lee then moved to the University of California, Irvine, where he held the Donald Bren Professorship in Biological Chemistry. Lee returned to Taiwan in 2014, to assume a professorship at China Medical University. He concurrently served as CMU president from 2014 to 2019, between the tenures of Huang Jong-tsun and Mien-Chie Hung.

Lee is one of four cofounding scientists of GeneTex, alongside Joel B. Baseman, C. Kent Osborne, and Eva Y.-H. P. Lee.

Lee was elected a member of Academia Sinica in 1994, and awarded fellowship of the American Association for the Advancement of Science in 2012, the United States National Academy of Inventors in 2014, and The World Academy of Sciences in 2018.
