= Genetex =

GeneTex, Inc
- Company type: Private
- Industry: Biotechnology; Life sciences
- Founded: 1997
- Founders: Joel B. Baseman; Eva Y.-H. P. Lee; Wen-Hwa Lee; C. Kent Osborne
- Headquarters: Irvine, CA
- Areas served: International
- Products: Research Antibodies, kits and assays for biological research
- Number of employees: 50-200
- Website: www.genetex.com

GeneTex, Inc. is a multinational life sciences reagent manufacturer and biotechnology company that develops, licenses, and sells research antibodies and other products. Its active catalog of almost 50,000 items is composed of antibodies, recombinant proteins, and other reagents for use by academic and industry investigators involved in basic and translational biomedical research. GeneTex’s product listing spans the spectrum of biomedicine with catalogs focused on cancer biology, neuroscience, cell biology, infectious disease, metabolism, epigenetics, immunology, and ten other research areas. As an antibody manufacturer, GeneTex has adopted a recombinant monoclonal antibody production platform and refined validation strategies to generate best-in-class reagents characterized by performance consistency, scalability, and reliability.

== History ==
GeneTex was established in 1997 in San Antonio, Texas by the scientists Joel B. Baseman, C. Kent Osborne, Wen‑Hwa Lee, and Eva Y.-H. P. Lee. In 2007, the company invested in a major expansion by opening production and development facilities in Taiwan. Two years later, the U.S. headquarters moved to Irvine, California to be closer to major universities and biotech hubs. In 2020, GeneTex established new facilities in Taiwan dedicated to recombinant monoclonal antibody production and augmented product quality assurance procedures.

== Recombinant monoclonal antibody technology ==
GeneTex incorporated recombinant monoclonal antibody technology into its product development platform in 2020 to complement its established catalog of standard polyclonal and hybridoma monoclonal antibodies. This change was a response to the needs of researchers and to an evolution in the commercial antibody industry towards renewable antibodies. Thus, the vast majority of the company’s new antibody manufacturing has utilized this approach since that time. Recombinant monoclonal antibodies offer numerous well-documented advantages, with consistent performance and scalability being of paramount significance. The specific protocol employed is a multi-parameter protocol based on fluorescence-activated cell sorting (FACS) to isolate antigen-specific memory B cells from an immunized animal. Cloning of the antibody heavy and light chain variable-region genes into an immunoglobulin G (IgG) backbone is followed by expression in mammalian cells. The entire development procedure can be completed in weeks. In addition, it decreases animal usage as the cloned antibody can be subsequently generated using a scalable bioreactor platform.

== Product Quality and Validation ==
To ensure reproducibility and reliability, GeneTex adheres to quality standards outlined in ISO 9001:2015, ISO 13485:2016, and ISO 14001:2015 [1]. The company emphasizes stringent validation of its antibodies for applications including western blotting (WB), immunoprecipitation (IP), immunohistochemistry (IHC), immunocytochemistry (ICC/IF), flow cytometry (FCM), and ELISA. Antibody characterization is based on a “Five‑Pillar Validation” framework that includes (1) Knockout/Knockdown, (2) Comparable Antibodies, (3) Immunoprecipitation followed by Mass Spectrometry (IP/MS), (4) Biological and Orthogonal Validation, and (5) Recombinant Protein Expression.
