= Amelia Calonge =

Spanish paleontologist

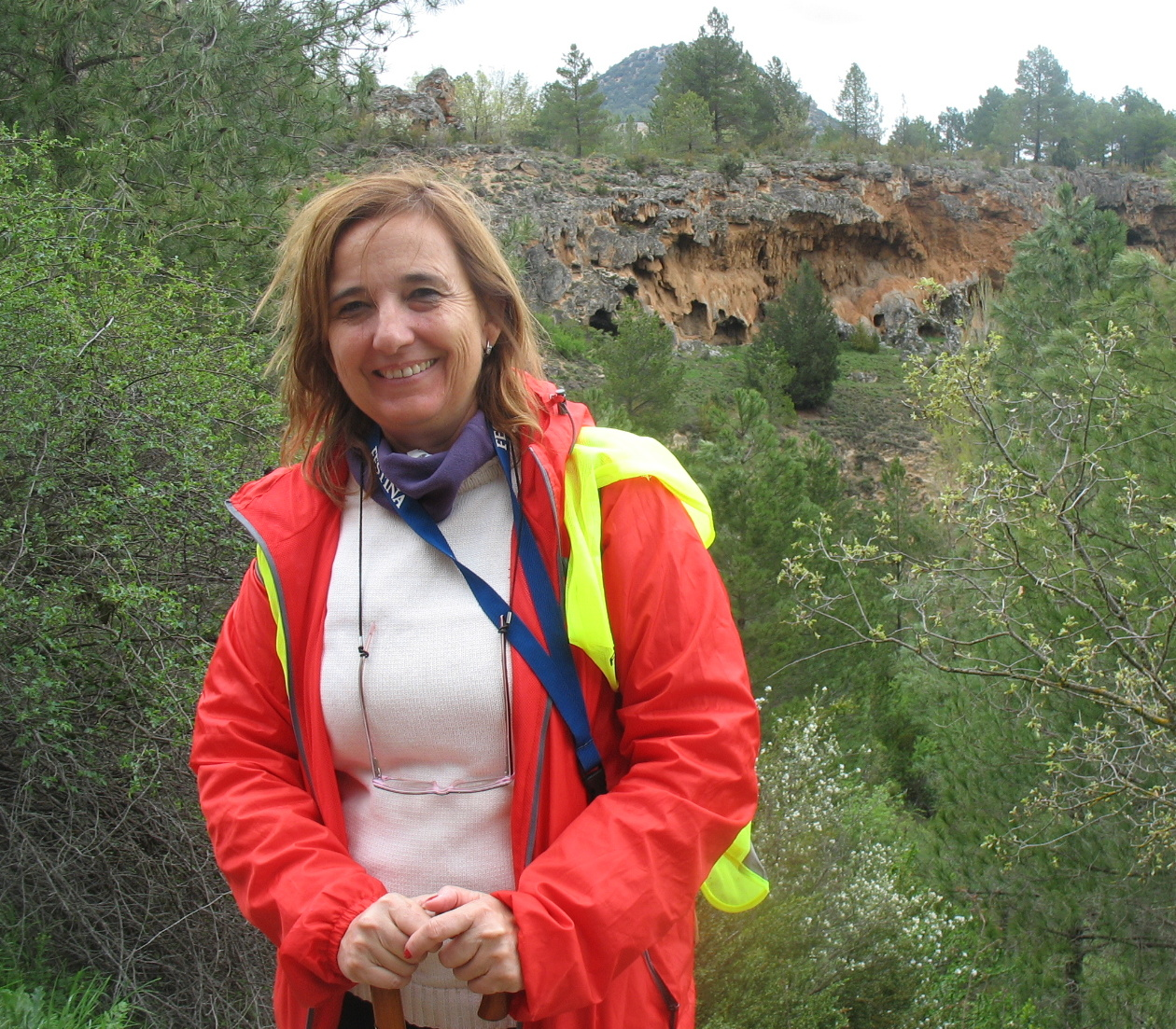

María Amelia Calonge García (born 1960 in Soria, Spain) is a Spanish geologist, paleontologist, and geoscience educator, specialist in foraminifera and the teaching and dissemination of geology. She is a professor at the University of Alcalá and since 2025, serves as the director of the UNESCO Chair in Scientific Education for Latin America and the Caribbean. She has been involved in promoting geoscience education since the 2000s, particularly through her role in creating and leading the Spanish Geology Olympiad.

== Education and academic career ==
Amelia Calonge earned her degree in geological science (1984) and her PhD in palaeontology (1989) from the Complutense University of Madrid. Her doctoral thesis, Bioestratigraphy of the Cenomanian of the Iberian Range Using Benthic Foraminifera, was supervised by Manuel Segura Redondo and Álvaro García Quintana.

She has been affiliated with the University of Alcalá since 1985, holding various academic positions. Since 1998, she has served as a professor, teaching within the teacher training degree program, the master’s degree in teacher training in secondary education and the interuniversity master’s in advanced paleontology.

Her early research career involved work in biostratigraphy and micropalaeontology, resulting in more than 50 publications in this field. Since 2002, her focus shifted to the Dissemination and Didactics of Geology. She currently coordinates the EXCELENCIA Teaching Innovation Group and has produced more than 70 publications in the field of Geosciences teaching. Her overall scholarly output includes over 100 scientific publications, 10 books, and 25 book chapters.

== Leadership and institutional service ==
Dr. Calonge institutional and policy leadership includes:

- Director of the UNESCO Chair in Science Education for Latin America and the Caribbean (appointed June 2025).
- Dean of the Faculty of Education at the University of Alcalá for six years (2013-2019).
- President of the Spanish Association for the Teaching of Earth Sciences (AEPECT) from 2006 to 2014, and a board member from 2004 to the present.
- Long-standing member of the Scientific Committee of the Molina-Alto Tajo Geopark since 2013.
- She has served as a coordinator of a multidisciplinary research group focused on Geoscience Education and Geological Heritage.

Her current work focuses on the didactics of experimental sciences specifically initiatives that bridge geological research with classroom practice. Since 2008, she has coordinated teaching groups at the University of Alcalá. She first led the Earth Science Education Group (2008–2020) and later the EXCELENCIA (Excellence) Teaching Innovation Group, which she continues to coordinate. Both initiatives under the Research, Create, Build (ICC, by its Spanish acronym) Research Group aim to connect educational stages and foster engagement with science. She has also collaborated with various scientific and educational organizations, including the AEPECT (Spanish Association for the teaching of Earth Sciences), to develop resources that connect geological research with classroom practice and public outreach. Since she is one of their founders of the International Earth Science Olympiad (IESO), where serves as a council member, she has also supported the development of similar Olympiads across Latin America and The Caribbean region. Furthermore, in 2025, Calonge was officially named the Director of the UNESCO Chair in Scientific Education for Latin America and the Caribbean, a role that reinforces her commitment to global science education.

== Contributions to geoscience education ==
Amelia's teaching methodologies such as experiential, place-based, and inquiry-driven learning have been included on:

- Spanish Geology Olympiad: She conceived, led, and organized this annual activity at the provincial, national, and international levels since its inception in 2010. The Olympiad inspires thousands of secondary school students and educators, has a significant social impact, and has been shown to positively influence enrollment in geology degrees. Since 2018, due to the increasing success of these Olympiads, the Spanish Ministry of Education has officially recognized them on the same level as national competitions in physics, chemistry, mathematics, biology, geology, economics, and computer science. Winners represent Spain at the IESO.
- Geodays and Geotourism: She has been responsible for Geolodía de Guadalajara since 2009, a prominent annual public outreach event that features guided field trips to promote the local geological heritage and the Molina-Alto Tajo Geopark.
- Curriculum Advocacy: She spearheaded two national campaigns advocating for the inclusion of geology in compulsory education, leading to a working group of Spanish scientific societies that provided a foundational guide for Earth science curricula.
- Educational Resources: She co-authored the foundational "Earth Science Literacy" framework in Spain (Pedrinaci et al., 2013), which defined core geological competencies for educational policymakers.

== Awards and recognition ==
Dr. Calonge has received distinctions for her work, including:

- First prize in the final of the Science in Action Program (Cosmocaixa, Barcelona, 2014).
- Recognition for her work by the UNESCO Chair in Science Education for Latin America and the Caribbean on its 20th anniversary (2019).
- Designated Honorary member of the Illustrious Official College of Geologists of Spain (2010).
- INNOVA-UCM Award for the project Geodivulgar: Geology and Society in the Innovation Projects call of the Vice-Rectorate for Quality (2019–2020).
- The 2025 Chris King Medal for Excellence in Geoscience Education, by the IUGS Commission on Geoscience Education (COGE)in recognition of her contributions to geoscience education worldwide.

== Selected publications and key contributions to geoscience education ==
=== Peer-reviewed journal articles ===
- Calonge García, A., Fesharaki, O., & López Carrillo, M. D. (2022). Spanish Geology Olympiad winners: What they think about their geology learning and the Olympics experience? A prospective study. Episodes, 45(3), 299-308.
- Fesharaki, O., Calonge García, A., & López Carrillo, M. D. (2020). The educational role of Geology Olympiads in Spain: Promotion of geological heritage and geoconservation between the youngsters. Geoheritage, 12(96), 1-12.
- López Carrillo, D., Calonge García, A., Rodríguez Laguna, M. T., Ros Magán, G., & Lebrón Moreno, A. (2019). Using gamification in a teaching innovation project at the University of Alcalá: A new approach to experimental science practices. The Electronic Journal of E-Learning, 17(2), 93-106.
- Fermeli, G., Meléndez, G., Koutsouveli, A., Dermitzakis, M., Calonge, A., Steininger, F., D'Arpa, C., & Di Patti, C. (2015). Geosciences' teaching and students' interest in secondary schools: Preliminary results from an interest research in Greece, Spain and Italy. Geoheritage, 7, 13-24.

=== Book chapters ===
- Calonge García, A., Molina Navarro, E., & Alfaro García, P. (2022). Dissemination about the environment: Keys to impulse the abiotic component of environmental education. In C. Vasconcelos & C. S. C. Calheiros (Eds.), Enhancing environmental education through nature-based solutions (pp. 9–24). Springer.
- Dr. Calonge co-authored the foundational "Earth Science Literacy" framework in Spain (Pedrinaci et al., 2013), which defined core geological competencies and has been presented to educational policymakers.
