= Tsai Yi-lin =

Taiwanese historian

- 蔡佾霖
- Born: 29 March 1987 (age 39); Zhonghe District, New Taipei City, Taiwan
- Occupations: Historian, teacher, writer

Academic background
- Education: National Taiwan Normal University (BA, MA, PhD)
- Thesis: The Juristic Space of Tang Chang-An City
- Doctoral advisor: Chen Den-wu

Academic work
- Discipline: History
- Main interests: History of the Maya civilization, History of Tang dynasty, Archaeology

Tsai Yi-lin (Chinese: 蔡佾霖, born 29 March 1987), nicknamed "Mayaman" (Chinese: 馬雅人) in PTT, is a Taiwanese historian, teacher, archaeologist, and writer who specializes in history of the Maya civilization and the history of the Tang dynasty. He was an active member of PTT and had participated in "ancient" (Chinese: 古文明板) and "Gossiping" (Chinese: 八卦板) forums. He was known for his knowledgeable posts about Maya civilization and historical research. Currently, Tsai is a history teacher at BTS (Chinese: 無界塾), an alternative education institution in Taiwan.

== Biography ==
Tsai Yi-lin was born in Zhonghe, Taipei County (now Zhonghe District, New Taipei City). His father is a plumber and his mother sells clothes in a department store. He has a younger brother, who is also a plumber, and a younger sister who works as a bank clerk. His interest of Maya civilization started from his age of 12, when he found a book about Maya civilization in his class. After high school days, Tsai enrolled in Department of History, National Taiwan Normal University. His history score was in the top 200 of all test takers of the Advanced Subjects Test, a test for university admission that is held in Taiwan. Tsai continued to study Maya and archaeology in his college days.

Tsai developed his interest in Tang dynasty from Chen Den-wu in college and Tatsuhiko Seo in graduate school. Under the influence of Chen and Seo, Tsai studied the Tang dynasty in graduate school. According to Tsai, Maya civilization is an unpopular field of study: His study group of Maya can only last one or two years. Tsai described his interest as "lonely". Despite his active participation in "ancient" (Chinese: 古文明板) of PTT by sharing his knowledge of Maya and archaeology, Tsai was not noticed until 2012, when the 2012 phenomenon was a popular thing. Pochan Chen (Chinese: 陳伯楨), an archaeologist of National Taiwan University, invited him to attend the Maya civilization forum held by Central America Trade Office after reading his articles on PTT in 2012, and introduced him to Jaime Awe, an archaeologist in Belize. Under Chen and Awe's support, Tsai participated in local excavation at Cahal Pech, Belize, in 2013.

Tsai served his substitute service in Wufeng, Hsinchu. Tsai engaged in historial study after his service. He was married in 2017 and had his daughter in 2020.

Currently, Tsai is a history teacher at BTS, a columnist in Storystudio.tw, and operates a Facebook fanpage called "Mayan Office in Taiwan" (Chinese: 馬雅國駐臺辦事處).
