= IESO =

The acronym IESO could refer to:

- International Earth Science Olympiad, an annual competition for secondary school students.
- Independent Electricity System Operator, the Crown corporation responsible for overseeing the bulk electrical system in Ontario, Canada.
