= Monica Morrow =

- Occupation: Surgeon
- Awards: Komen Brinker Award for Scientific Distinction (2016)

Monica Morrow is a breast cancer surgeon and Chief of Breast Surgery at Memorial Sloan Kettering Cancer Center in Manhattan, NYC. Her first day seeing patients in clinic as Chief at MSKCC was Tuesday, February 19, 2008. She formerly served as the chairman of surgical oncology at the Fox Chase Cancer Center. She is the President-elect of the Society for Surgical Oncology.

In 2005 she was elected to the Royal College of Physicians and Surgeons of Glasgow. And in 2004 the Chicago Sun-Times named Morrow one of the top 20 most powerful women in health care in Chicago.

Morrow served on the National Cancer Policy Board for three years until 2002. She was the first surgeon to do so. She is the author of several books on breast cancer for both researchers and the general public.

Morrow graduated with a BS degree from Pennsylvania State University, received her MD degree from Jefferson Medical College in 1976, served her general surgery residency at the Medical Center Hospital of Vermont and completed a surgical oncology fellowship at Memorial Sloan-Kettering Cancer Center in 1983.

In 1988 Morrow became an associate professor of surgery at the University of Chicago and also director of the multidisciplinary breast cancer team. In 1993 she joined the faculty at Northwestern University as Professor of Surgery and director of the Lynn Sage Comprehensive Breast Center.

== Publications ==
- Elk, Ronit & Morrow, Monica, (2003) Breast Cancer for Dummies, For Dummies, ISBN 0-7645-2482-8
- Morrow, Monica & Jordan, V. Craig, (2003) Managing Breast Cancer Risk, B.C. Decker, ISBN 1-55009-260-X
- Harris, Jay R; Lippman, Marc E; Morrow, Monica; & C. Kent Osborne, (2004) Diseases of the Breast, Lippincott Williams & Wilkins, ISBN 0-7817-4619-1

== Sources ==
Fox Chase Cancer Center press release, Monica Morrow Elected to the Royal College of Physicians and Surgeons of Glasgow, retrieved August 22, 2006
