= Carlos Arteaga =

Ecuadorian scientist

Carlos L. Arteaga, M.D., was appointed Director of the Harold C. Simmons Comprehensive Cancer Center and Associate Dean of Oncology Programs at UT Southwestern Medical Center in Dallas in September 2017. Previously, he was the Associate Director for Clinical Research, director of the Center for Cancer Targeted Therapies, and professor of Cancer Biology and Medicine at Vanderbilt-Ingram Cancer Center. In 2014–2015, he was the president of the American Association for Cancer Research.

Arteaga earned his medical degree from the Universidad de Guayaquil in Ecuador in 1980, where his father was the dean of medicine. He came to the United States intending to specialize in cardiology after his internal medicine residency at Emory University, but changed course and instead did a fellowship in hematology-oncology at University of Texas Health Science Center.

Arteaga joined the faculty at Vanderbilt in 1989 and since 2002, has directed the NCI-funded Vanderbilt Breast Cancer Specialized Program of Research Excellence (SPORE).

== Research ==
Arteaga is recognized as an expert in the field of breast cancer research. He has demonstrated the utility of targeting TGF-β, which causes cancer to spread, metastasize, and become resistant to chemotherapeutic drugs. He was involved in the development of trastuzumab in combination with chemotherapy for patients with HER2-mutated cancer. Among his current research areas is triple-negative breast cancer, for which there are no targeted therapy options.

He is a principal investigator for the Stand Up To Cancer (SU2C) "Targeting the PI3K Pathway in Women's Cancers" Dream Team, which provides $15 million is research funding for a research team spread across 7 institutions.

== Awards ==
- 2015 Prize for Scientific Excellence in Medicine, American-Italian Cancer Foundation
- 2014 President, American Association for Cancer Research
- 2014 Grant W. Liddle Award, Vanderbilt University
- 2013 Elected Fellow, American Association for the Advancement of Science
- 2011 Brinker Award for Scientific Distinction in Basic Science, Susan G. Komen Foundation
- 2009 Gianni Bonadonna Award, American Society of Clinical Oncology
- 2005 Elected Member, Association of American Physicians
- 2004–2007 Board of Directors, AACR
- 2003 AACR-Richard & Hinda Rosenthal Award
- 1998 Elected Member, American Society for Clinical Investigation
- 1995–2000 Clinical Investigator Award, U.S. Department of Veteran Affairs
