= Earth Science Education Unit =

The Earth Science Education Unit (ESEU) provided professional development (CPD) workshops and resources for teachers and trainee teachers in Earth science Education across the UK between 2002 and 2015.

== History ==
ESEU was first set up in 2002 with funding from the UK Offshore Operators Association (UKOOA), initially providing workshops in England and Scotland for secondary teachers. In January 2003, ESEU launched workshops in Wales. A second lot of funding from Oil and Gas UK, the umbrella organization for the Oil and Gas industry in the UK, through OPITO, the Oil and Gas Academy, was secured in 2007 enabling ESEU to develop primary workshops in England and Wales at Key Stage 2 in 2009 and to launch new workshops in Scotland, written especially for the Curriculum for Excellence in 2010. Between 2002 and 2017, Christopher John Henry King was the Director of ESEU.

== Workshops ==
ESEU provided workshops at Key Stages 2, 3 and 4, and for the Scottish Curriculum for Excellence, to teachers and to trainee teachers. Workshop fees were covered by ESEU. A team of 46 facilitators are spread across the UK and travel to schools to give workshops, taking rock samples and other equipment with them.

Practical, hands-on activities were used in the workshops, which use simple, easily available and cheap materials, such as party poppers, Potty Putty and Slinky springs.

As well as activities for use in the classroom, ESEU also encouraged teachers to make the most of the outdoor environment as a teaching resource, using a gradual approach, starting by using the view from a classroom window, then the school grounds, a local graveyard or building stones in the local town and finally any local quarry or outcrop.

ESEU workshops were considered innovative practical and interactive.

ESEU also provided online resources on earth science education, including a virtual rock kit, Scottish virtual activities, a rock reference sheet and videos of salol crystallising at different rates. However ESEU was discontinued in 2016 after reformulations at the Keele University.
