= Henry T. Lynch =

American physician (1928–2019)

- Born: January 4, 1928; Lawrence, Massachusetts, U.S.
- Died: June 2, 2019 (aged 91); Omaha, Nebraska, U.S.
- Education: University of Oklahoma; University of Denver; University of Texas at Austin; University of Texas Medical Branch
- Occupation: Physician
- Known for: Discovery of genetic causes of cancer and namesake of Lynch syndrome

Henry Thompson Lynch (January 4, 1928 – June 2, 2019) was an American physician noted for his discovery of familial susceptibility to certain kinds of cancer and his research into genetic links to cancer.

He is sometimes described as "the father of hereditary cancer detection and prevention" or the "father of cancer genetics", although Lynch himself said that title should go to the early 20th century pathologist Aldred Scott Warthin.

Lynch was the chairman of preventive medicine at Creighton University School of Medicine in Omaha, Nebraska and held the Charles F. and Mary C. Heider Endowed Chair in Cancer Research.

== Early life and education ==
Lynch was born in Lawrence, Massachusetts and grew up in New York City. He dropped out of high school at 14 and joined the U. S. Navy at age 16, using false identification to disguise his age. He served as a gunner during World War II.

After his discharge in 1946 Lynch became a professional boxer under the nickname "Hammerin' Hank". After obtaining a high school equivalency, he received a bachelor's degree from the University of Oklahoma in 1951 and a master's degree in clinical psychology from the University of Denver in 1952.

He studied for a Ph.D. in human genetics from the University of Texas at Austin and received an M.D. from the University of Texas Medical Branch in Galveston in 1960. He interned at St. Mary's Hospital in Evansville, Indiana and completed a residency in internal medicine at the University of Nebraska College of Medicine.

== Career ==
Lynch served as an assistant professor at the University of Texas MD Anderson Cancer Center, then joined the faculty at Creighton University in 1967. Noting that some cancer patients had relatives and ancestors with the same type of cancer, Lynch postulated that cancer could be hereditary. He began to focus his research on that possibility, although it was considered unlikely by the medical establishment of the time, which was focused on environmental causes of cancer; in fact the American Cancer Society frequently stated that cancer was not hereditary.

In 1970, he applied for a research grant from the National Institutes of Health, citing a family in which numerous members had colon cancer, but the grant application was rejected, as were most of his other grant applications over the following 20 years. He persisted, compiling data and statistics that demonstrated patterns of "cancer syndromes" through multiple generations of families.

He defined the necessary criteria for a genetic cancer: early age of onset of the disease, specific pattern of multiple primary cancers, and Mendelian patterns of inheritance in hundreds of extended families worldwide.

His theory of genetically based cancers was eventually accepted. His best-known example, hereditary nonpolyposis colorectal cancer, is the most common form of hereditary colorectal cancer and is generally known as Lynch syndrome. He demonstrated the Mendelian inheritance pattern for certain breast and ovarian cancers, which laid the groundwork for the identification of specific genes responsible for these familial cancers, such as BRCA1 and BRCA2.

In 1984, he established the Hereditary Cancer Prevention Clinic at Creighton, which focuses on identifying risk factors, promoting early detection, and preventing the onset of familial cancers. Under his leadership Creighton also hosts a High Risk Registry, part of the Early Detection Research Network sponsored by the National Cancer Institute. The Registry allows the Network to educate individual patients about their genetic risk status. Lynch died of congestive heart failure on June 2, 2019, at the age of 91.

=== Bibliography ===
Lynch has written hundreds of articles and several books, including

- —— (1967). "Heredity and the More Common Malignancies of Man: Carcinoma of the Breast, Stomach, Colon, Lung, Prostate, and Endometrium". Hereditary factors in carcinoma - Chapter 3 in Recent Results in Cancer Research. Vol. 12. Springer Verlag. pp. 35–52. doi:10.1007/978-3-642-48252-6_3. ISBN 9783642482526.
- —— (1971). Cancer and You. Charles C Thomas Pub Ltd.
- —— (1976). Cancer Genetics. Charles C Thomas Pub Ltd. ISBN 9780398032227.
- —— (1981). Genetics and Breast Cancer. Van Nostrand Reinhold. ISBN 9780442249199.

== Recognition ==
Lynch has received several awards:

- 1992: American Cancer Society's Distinguished Service Award.
- 1997: American Cancer Society's Medal of Honor Clinical Research Award.
- 1998: Komen Brinker Award for Scientific Distinction.
- 2000: American Society of Clinical Oncology's American Cancer Society Award; his award lecture was titled "Cancer Prevention in Hereditary Cancer: Lynch Syndrome as Model".
