= Chan Tah Wei =

Taiwanese writer and academic

Chan Tah Wei 陳大為
- Born: 28 September 1969 (age 56); Ipoh, Perak, Malaysia
- Citizenship: Taiwanese
- Education: National Taiwan University (BA); Soochow University (MPhil); National Taiwan Normal University (PhD)
- Spouse: Chong Yee-Voon (m. 1994)
- Writing career
- Period: 1989–present
- Genres: Modern Chinese poetry; Prose; Literary criticism
- Subject: Literary modernism

Chinese name
- Traditional Chinese: 陳大為
Transcriptions
Standard Mandarin
- Hanyu Pinyin: Chén Dàwéi
Yue: Cantonese
- Jyutping: Can^{4} Daai^{6} Wai^{4}
Southern Min
- Hokkien POJ: Tân Tāi-ûi

Chan Tah Wei (Chinese: 陳大為; pinyin: Chén Dàwéi; born 28 September 1969) is a Taiwanese poet, prose writer, and academic. He is currently teaching at the National Taiwan University.

== Early life and education ==
Chan was born in Ipoh, Perak, Malaysia, on 28 September 1969. After high school, he graduated from National Taiwan University with a Bachelor of Arts in Chinese literature and earned a Master of Philosophy in Chinese from Soochow University. He then earned his Ph.D. from National Taiwan Normal University in 2000. His doctoral dissertation was titled, "Urban Writing in Modern Chinese Poetry in Asia (1980-1999)".

== Academic career ==
After receiving his doctorate, Chan taught at Nanya Institute of Technology and Yuan Ze University, before returning to National Taiwan University as assistant professor.

== Writings ==
Chan mainly writes Modern Chinese poetries and had been receiving awards since his university years. He wrote The Prologue of Controlled Waters (Chinese:治洪前書) based on Chinese mythology, Swan Goose Gate Again (Chinese:再鴻門) which deconstructs Chinese history and The City Kingdom full of Phantoms (Chinese:盡是魅影的城國) which illustrates the daily lives of sojourned Chinese. While unlike the first three collection of poetries which focused on narratives and writing techniques, Chan wrote Approaching Ramayana (Chinese:靠近 羅摩衍那), his fourth collection of poetries, with a less intense narrative and included references to other Asian poems, such as Bei Dao and Guo Lusheng’s works and the Sanskrit epic Ramayana, differing from other modern poetries which often include Western literary or historical references and imageries.
