= Tung-Tai Lin =

Taiwanese academic

Charles Tung-Tai Lin (Chinese: 林東泰; born April 25, 1950) is currently a professor at the Graduate Institute of Mass Communication at National Taiwan Normal University, NTNU (國立臺灣師範大學), where he served as vice president from August 2011 to July 2014. His fields of interest include communication theories, research methodology, opinion survey, and social marketing.

== Education ==
- BA in Department of Adult and Continuing Education, Journalism Group, NTNU
- MA in Department of Journalism, National Chengchi University
- MA in Department of Mass Communication, Michigan State University, U.S.
- Ph.D. in Department of Mass Communication, Ohio State University, U.S.

== Governmental positions ==
- 2006/02-2008/08 Commissioner, National Communications Commission
- 2001/12-2004/12 Director, The 2nd Public Television Foundation Board
- 2000-2004 President, Chinese Association for Public Opinion Research
- 1998/12-2001/12 Director, The 1st Public Television Foundation Board
- 1998-2001 Commissioner, The 2nd Cable Radio and TV Commission
- 1999-2000 Vice president, Chinese Association for Public Opinion Research
- 1995-1998 Commissioner, The 1st Cable Radio and TV Commission
- 1988-1999 Secretary general, Chinese Association for Public Opinion Research
- 1994-1998 Vice chairman, The Institute of Education for Mass Communication of R. O. C.

== Academic positions ==
- 2011/08-2014/07 Vice President, NTNU
- 2009/08-Now Dean, College of Social Sciences, NTNU
- 1997/08-2003/07 Director, The Graduate Institute of Mass Communication, NTNU
- 1993/08-1995/07 Chairman, Department of Adult and Continuing Education, NTNU
- 1985/8-1990/7 Chairman, Department of Mass Communication, Tamkang University
