= Gordon B. Mills =

Oncology researcher

- Education: University of Alberta, Edmonton
- Known for: discovery of PI3K
- Scientific career
- Workplaces: MD Anderson Cancer Center; University of Toronto

Gordon B. Mills is the Wayne and Julie Drinkward Endowed Chair in Precision Oncology, Director of Precision Oncology, Director of SMMART Trials and Professor in Cell, Development and Cancer Biology in the Knight Cancer Institute at Oregon Health & Science University.

He is most well known for his discoveries in the PI3K pathway in breast cancer.

Mills received his BS in 1975, MD in 1977, and PhD in 1984, all from the University of Alberta, Edmonton. He did a postdoc in immunology at the Hospital for Sick Children in Toronto and then joined the faculty at the University of Toronto in 1985 as an assistant professor and director of oncology research. He was recruited to MD Anderson in 1994. He held multiple leadership positions at the MD Anderson Cancer Center including Chair of Systems Biology, Director of the Kleberg Center for Molecular Markers and was co Director of the Khalifa Institute for Personalized Cancer Therapy. He held the Weiss Distinguished University Chair. He was recruited to the Knight Cancer Institute as Director of Precision Oncology in October 2017.

Along with his research in PI3K, he focuses on signaling pathways and markers for targeted therapy. He and Lewis C. Cantley lead the Targeting PI3K in Women’s Cancers Stand Up To Cancer initiative.

His research has been funded by many sources such as the National Institutes of Health, National Cancer Institute, U.S. Department of Defense, AstraZeneca, Adelson Medical Research Foundation, Breast Cancer Research Foundation, GlaxoSmithKline, American Association for Cancer Research, and the Susan G. Komen Breast Cancer Foundation.

== Awards ==
- 2006 Inaugural Waun Ki Hong Award for Mentorship, MD Anderson Cancer Center
- 2008 The Peter Steck Memorial award of the Brain Tumor Foundation
- 2009 Waun Ki Hong Award for Excellence in Team Science, MD Anderson Cancer Center
- 2010–2018 Olga Keith Wiess Distinguished University Chair for Cancer Research, MD Anderson Cancer Center
- 2012 - Elected fellow of the American Association for the Advancement of Science
- 2013 Brinker Award for Excellence in Science, Susan G Komen
- 2014 Laura Ziskin Award, SU2C/AACR
- 2015 - Fellow of the Association of American Physicians
- 2016 Finneran Family Prize for Excellence in Translational Research
- 2018 - Wayne and Julie Drinkward Endowed Chair in Precision Oncology
