= International Geoscience Education Organization =

The International Geoscience Education Organisation (IGEO)
- Abbreviation: IGEO
- Formation: 2000; 26 years ago
- Type: INGO, standard organisations
- Headquarters: Founded in Sydney, Australia. At 2000
- Region served: Worldwide
- Official language: English
- President: Roberto Greco
- Affiliations: IUGS IAPG
- Website: igeoscied.org

The International Geoscience Education Organisation (IGEO) is an international non-governmental organization aimed to promote the improvement of the quality of geoscience education worldwide.

== About ==
The International Geoscience Education Organisation (IGEO) was created in the framework of the 3rd International Conference on Geoscience Education in Sydney, Australia. It conducts activities to enhance the quality of geoscience education worldwide and search for policies on that subject. IGEO collaborates with the Commission on Geoscience Education of the International Union of Geological Sciences.

== Activities ==
IGEO organizes the following events:

- GeoSciEd: The conference on Geoscience Education which takes place every four years.
- Sessions on geoscience education during the International Geological Congress.
- IESO: International Earth Sciences Olympiad, one of the major activities of IGEO.
- Geoscience Education Survey: IGEO reports on the subject of collaborating with nations around the world in looking for solutions on the inclusion of geosciences in the curricula properly, especially in the countries where mining resources are the base of economy.

== Teaching Resources ==
IGEO shares content to be used by teachers in education at school level. The material is reviewed by experts with the goal of including in the scholar curricula and active teaching methods in geoscience education.
