= Chang Chun-yen (education scholar) =

- Born: 29 September 1967 (age 58)
- Education: National Taiwan Normal University (BS); University of Texas at Austin (MEd, PhD)
- Occupation: Science education scholar
- Known for: Science education, E-learning, Interdisciplinary science learning, Science Communication

Chang Chun-yen (Chinese: 張俊彥; pinyin: Zhāng Jùnyàn; born 29 September 1967) is a science education scholar in Taiwan. Currently, Chang serves as National Taiwan Normal University (NTNU) Chair Professor, director of Science Education Center (NTNU), as well as a professor of the Graduate Institute of Science Education and the Department of Earth Sciences. From August 2013 to February 2014, Chang has been to Paris 8 University (France) for 6-month research, funded by National Science Council (NSC) Short-term Abroad Research Program. This research attempts to explore the usability and feasibility of how innovative technologies can be implemented in science classrooms. In the past two years, Chang has also been a visiting professor at the Hong Kong Institute of Education, Paris 8 University, and the Taipei Medical University.

== Activities ==
Currently, Chang is the associate editor of the Journal of Research in Science Teaching and Journal of Geosciences Education. He is also on the editorial board of three SSCI-level journals: Studies in Science Education (science education) and Learning, Media & Technology (instructional technology), and Eurasia Journal of Mathematics, Science and Technology Education (science education). He used to be the referee of professorship promotion for Texas A&M University, Carnegie Mellon University, University of Michigan, University of Alaska at Anchorage, and the Hong Kong Institute of Education, as well as a Ph.D. dissertation committee member in Australia.

During recent years, Chang has been invited to give speeches in countries such as the United States, United Kingdom, France, Germany, Sweden, China, Japan, South Korea, Singapore, Hong Kong, Inner Mongolia Autonomous Region, Turkey, Philippines, Oman, and the India.

Chang has been a long-term member of the International Earth Science Olympiad Advisory Committee. In 2009, Chang hosted the 3rd IESO in Taiwan. Chang has been Taiwan IESO Organizing Project Director since 2007, responsible for nurturing Taiwan's top high-school students in earth science. Nurtured students from Taiwan have been awarded gold medal for seven years in a row.

Since 1998, Chang has participated more than 40 National Science Council projects, and serves as a long-term project reviewer of the NSC's Department of Science Education. From 2011, Chang has been the Project Director of Center of Research Excellence in Science Education (CRESE) of the Aim for the Top University Project at NTNU. As a representative of NTNU's of Science Education Center, Chang also joined the European Union's Open Science Resources project, one of the two subprojects for non-EU areas and review research projects by Israel Science Foundation, South Korea's National Research Foundation, and Estonian Research Council.

From 2015, Chang has been the Expert Panel Member/Academic Consultant of the NMC Horizon Report(2015 K-12 Edition), China National Assessment of Education Quality, and The Hong Kong Institute of Education.

== Academic background ==
- June 1994–August 1996: Ph.D., Science Education, University of Texas at Austin, United States
- August 1992–May 1994: M.Ed., Science Education, University of Texas at Austin, United States
- September 1985–June 1990: B.S., Earth Science, National Taiwan Normal University, Taipei, Taiwan

== Professional employment ==
- NTNU Chair Professor, National Taiwan Normal University (NTNU), Taiwan (August 2013 to present)
- Adjunct Professor, Graduate Institute of Science Education and the Department of Earth Sciences, NTNU, Taiwan (August 2008 to present)
- Director, Science Education Center, NTNU, Taiwan (August 2006 to present)
- Visiting professor, Taipei Medical University, Taiwan (August 2012 to present)
- Associate editor, Journal of Research in Science Teaching (January 2015 to present)
- Associate editor, Journal of Geoscience Education (April 2009 to present)
- Editorial Advisory Board member, Studies in Science Education (2013 to present)
- Editorial Board Member, Eurasia Journal of Mathematics, Science and Technology Education (2005 to present)
- Editorial Board Member, Learning, Media & Technology (2001 to present)
- Advisory Board Member, Korean National Curriculum Reform committee (May 2014 to present)
- President, The Association of Science Education in Taiwan (2010–2012)
- Senior Research Fellow, Center for Science and Mathematics Education Center, The University of Texas at Austin, Austin, TX (USA) (January 2005 to July 2005)

== Professional awards ==
- 2013: Academic Award of Ministry of Education (Social Sciences) & National Science Council Award for Excellent Contributions in Technology Transfer
- 2003, 2009, 2012: Outstanding Research Award of the National Science Council
- 2008: “Science 50”─ Scientific Achievements of the National Science Council 50th Anniversary (Science Education): Only 50 of the most remarkable scientific achievements were selected in celebration of NSC 50th Anniversary". Chang's research on “The ability to solve science problems and opening automatic evaluation system for science study and examination,” was chosen for this award.
- 2007: Listed in Marquis Who's Who in the World (24th-27th Editions), Who's Who in Science and Engineering (10th and 11th Edition), Who's Who in America (2009), and Special 30th Pearl Anniversary Edition of Who's Who in the World (2013).
