= Wang Ming-ke =

Taiwanese historian and anthropologist (born 1952)

- 王明珂
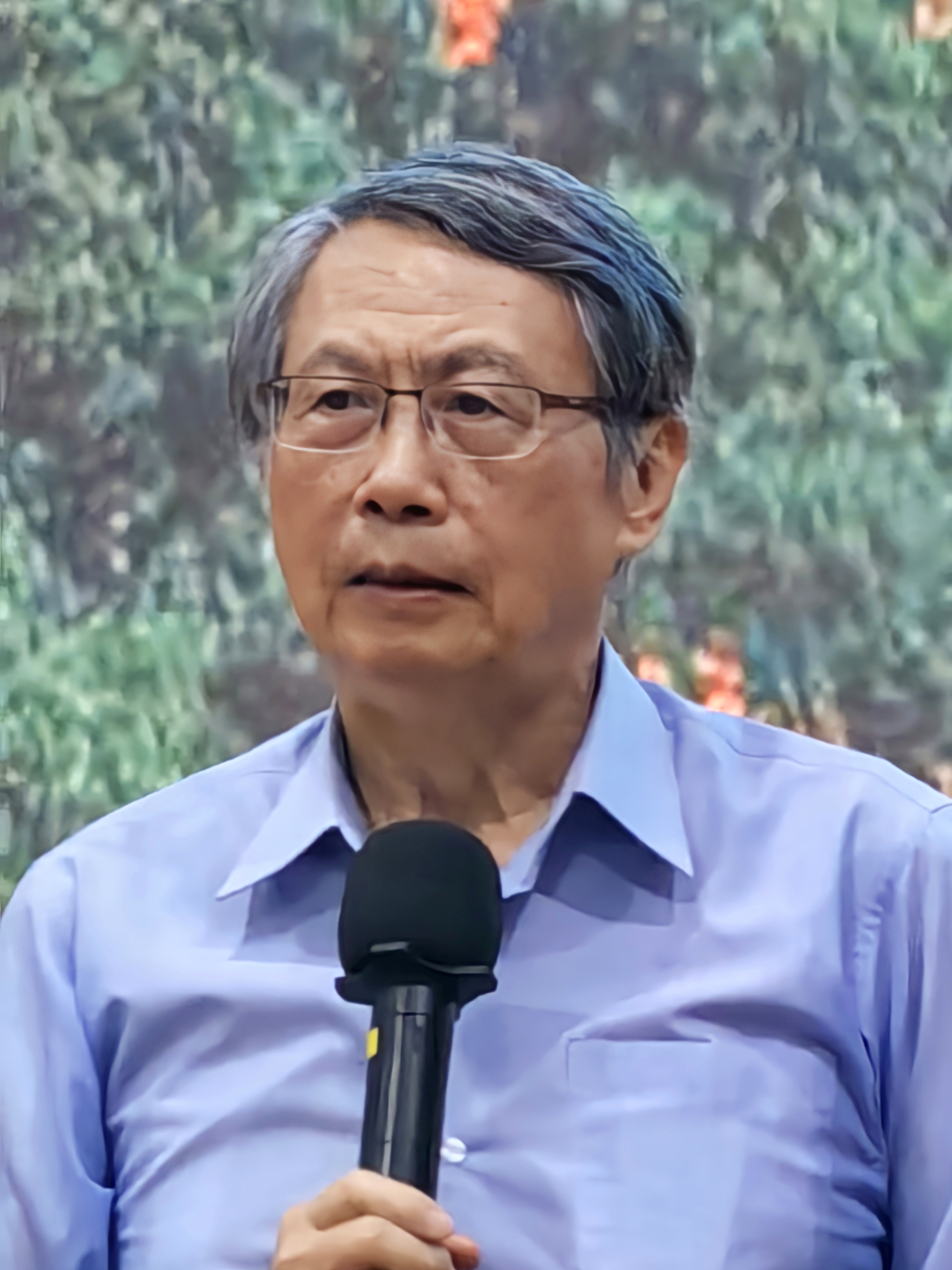
- Wang in 2024
- Born: 1952 (age 72–73); Fongshan, Kaohsiung, Taiwan
- Education: National Taiwan Normal University (BA, MA); Harvard University (PhD)
- Occupations: Historian; anthropologist

Wang Ming-ke (Chinese: 王明珂; born 1952) is a Taiwanese historian and anthropologist.

== Education and career ==
Wang earned bachelor's and master's degrees in history from National Taiwan Normal University in 1979 and 1983, respectively. He then earned a Ph.D. in history and anthropology at Harvard University in 1992, authoring the dissertation The Ch'iang of Ancient China through the Han Dynasty: Ecological Frontiers and Ethnic Boundaries.

Wang joined Academia Sinica as an assistant researcher in 1984, and was promoted to associate research fellow in 1993, after his doctorate was conferred. In 1999, Wang became a full research fellow, and continued in this role until 2014. He served twice as head of the anthropology division within Academia Sinica's Institute of History and Philology, from 2002 to 2003, and 2003 to 2004. In Taiwan Wang served as a guest professor at Soochow University from 2000 to 2002, then left for a professorship of anthropology at National Taiwan University, which he held until 2004, and became a National Tsing Hua University professor of history through 2005. Between 2010 and 2013, Wang was dean of the College of Liberal Arts at National Chung Hsing University. He also led NCHU's Research Center for the Humanities and Social Sciences from 2011 to 2012. Since 2016, Wang has served as an adjunct chair professor of history at National Taiwan Normal University.

Wang's teaching career outside of Taiwan include a number of visiting positions, including a Fulbright Visiting Scholar position at the University of California, Los Angeles Department of Art History from 1998 to 1999, a visiting scholar position at Harvard's Department of East Asian Languages and Civilizations and the Harvard–Yenching Institute from 2005 to 2006. He joined the University of California, Davis as a visiting scholar from 2009 to 2010, followed by Stanford University between 2013 and 2014, then moved to the International Research Center for Japanese Studies for 2014 and 2015.

== Honors and awards ==
In 2014, Wang was elected a member of Academia Sinica.
