= Martino Yu =

Taiwanese artist

Martino Yu (Chinese: 游宜群; born 1977), a Taiwanese artist, who was born in Taoyuan, North Taiwan. He had studied Chinese calligraphy and painting since the childhood. In Taipei, he majored in Chinese painting for the B.F.A and M.F.A. degree. Also good at singing, the artist obtained the certificates of classic vocal in Spain and Italy, respectively. After completing the PhD. study of design in 2010, he was awarded the Golden Melody Awards in 2011 with his tutor, Wen-bin Chou. Both of them are the rarely seen countertenors in Taiwan.

== Art characteristics ==
The artist had been studied the Chinese calligraphy and painting for the decades. He tends to read some Chinese philosophy classics and Buddhist ones for the knowledge or meditation. The life issues deeply inspire him, so the motifs of his art creations are always familiar to people. Besides, he admires the bold colours used by the Fauvists as well as the mortality concept expressed from Edvard Munch's works. He takes for granted that the ink painting is able to combining the traditional Chinese art spirits with the contemporary art ideology. In recent years, the artist starts to work oil/acrylic paintings with Chinese painting skills (e.g. The solo exhibition “Happiness. Rhythm of Flora” in 2011). He would like to discover an innovation for the contemporary art as well as the ink painting.

== Education ==
- 1997-2002 B.F.A. of Chinese Art Program, School of Fine Arts, Taipei National University of Arts
- Jul.1998-Sept.1998 Diploma of Early Music (Vocal), University of Santiago de Compostela, Spain
- 2002-2003 M.F.A. of Chinese Painting Program, Department of Fine Arts, College of Arts, National Taiwan Normal University
- 2006-2010 Ph.D. of Department of Industrial and Commercial Design, College of Design, National Taiwan University of Science and Technology
- Jul.2008 Certificate of Vocal, Soriano School, Italy

== Works ==
- 《Happiness. Rhythm of Flora.-Solo Exhibition》, 60cm x 60cm, Acrylic on canvas, 2011
- 《Happiness. Rhythm of Flora.-Solo Exhibition》, 40cm x 40cm, Acrylic on canvas, 2011
- 《Happiness. Rhythm of Flora.-Solo Exhibition》,35x35cm, Calligraphy No.32, 2008
- 《Prostration》,140cm x140cm, Ink Painting on Xuan Paper, 2003

== Art experience ==
Had engaged in the tutor of Taipei Mayor's Residence Arts Salon; Taiwan Police college; Department of Visual Communication Design at Jinwen University of Science and Technology; Department of Visual Communication Design at Huafan University; Department of Industrial and Commercial Design at National Taiwan University of Science and Technology. The current tutor of Department of Digital Literature and Arts at St. John's University.

- 1994 1st prize of Chinese calligraphy at “Taipei City Chinese Language Contest”
- 1998 Scholarship of Chinese painting by Master Huang Jun-Bi Fine Arts Aid Foundation
- 2008 Design prize of tattoo by Taiwan Shin Sa Etiquette Attire Association

== Exhibitions ==
- 1997 Group exhibition “International Artworks on Paper”, 1997 Guandu International Outdoor Sculpture Festival
- 1997 Group exhibition of photography, Jazz Image Gallery
- 2003 Group exhibition by “Ninety-Nine Calligraphy Union”, Taoyuan County Cultural Center
- 2003 Solo exhibition, Gallery of Nanshan High School
- 2003 Solo exhibition “Retrospect & Prospect”, Gallery of National Taiwan Normal University
- 2004 Group exhibition by “Ninety-Nine Calligraphy Union”, Taoyuan Municipal Library
- 2005 Solo exhibition of ink painting “Lighthouse” by Shin Kong Investment Co., Ltd, Taipei Mayor's Residence Arts Salon
- 2005 Publication “Reciprocal Square & Arc”, International Conference of Basic Design and Environmental Design
- 2006 Solo exhibition at the opening of Arts Center, Jinwen University of Science and Technology
- 2006 International exhibition, Korean Society of Basic Design & Art
- 2007 Solo exhibition at the opening of Sunny Bank (Changan Branch)
- 2008 Representative of Taiwan area, Asia Network Beyond Design (Tianjing, Sapporo, Seoul, Taiwan)
- 2008 Solo exhibition of Chinese calligraphy and painting “Apsaras Walker”, Taiwan Secom Cultural Foundation
- 2009 Solo exhibition of Chinese calligraphy at “Comprehension of Ordinary Elegance”, Taipei Mayor's Residence Arts Salon
- 2009 Group exhibition “Raining in the Mountain”, Nantou Lingshan Temple (Right View Classroom)
- 2009 Solo exhibition of Chinese calligraphy and painting at the opening of Ho Chao Feng Digital Arts Center, St. John's University
- 2011 Solo exhibition “Happiness, Rhythm of Flora”, Powen Gallery

== Collections ==
- 2003 Painting at “Young Citizen Painting Contest 2003” (held by Council for Cultural Affairs), collected by National Museum of History
- 2006 Painting “Landscape: Jinwen”, collected by Library of Jinwen University of Science and Technology
- 2007 Contract for Authorization of Main Collections, collected by National Taiwan Museum of Fine Arts

== Music experience ==
- 1998 “Taipei International Choral Festival”, National Theater Concert Hall, Taipei
- 2003 Host of “Music Banquet” at Chungho City Music Festival, Cultural Affairs Department, Taipei County Government, Taipei
- 2006 “Salon Concert” at the Castle Cafe, Taipei Zhongshan Hall, Taipei
- 2007 12 special concerts at the Howard Hotel, Taipei
- 2008 Invited as a researcher and performer by Soriano Camino Classic Vocal, Italy
- 2008 Solo of Baroque aria “Bach: Goldeberg Variation” with Academy of Taiwan Strings, National Theater Concert Hall, Taipei
- 2009 Solo of “Piano&Voice”, Taipei Mayor's Residence Arts Salon, Taipei
- 2010 “Easter Concert: Seven Last Words of Christ” by Contemporary Chamber Orchestra Taipei, Novel Hall for Performing Arts, Taipei
- 2011 Awarded "The Golden Melody Awards" in 2011 with Wen-bin Chou

== See also ==
- Taiwanese art
