= Chong Yee-Voon =

Malaysian writer

Chong Yee-Voon (Chinese: 鍾怡雯; pinyin: Zhōng Yíwén; Jyutping: Zung1 Ji4 Man4; Pe̍h-ōe-jī: Cheng Î-bûn; Pha̍k-fa-sṳ: Chûng Yì-vùn; born February 13, 1969, in Kampar, Perak) is a Malaysian writer who writes in Chinese. She is a professor in the Department of Chinese Linguistics and Literature at Yuan Ze University, Taiwan.

She studied at the National Taiwan Normal University. Her husband, Chan Tah Wei, a Malaysian writer, was her classmate.

== Selected works ==
- 1995:河宴
- 1998:垂釣睡眠
- 2000:聽說
- 2002:我和我豢養的宇宙
- 2005:飄浮書房
- 2007:野半島
- 2008:陽光如此明媚
- 2010:陳義芝編選
- 2014:麻雀樹
