= Earth Learning Idea =

Earth Learning Idea (ELI) provides free Earth-related teaching ideas, designed to be practical science and geography resources for secondary and primary teachers and teacher-trainers and trainees across the world. It is run on a voluntary basis by three teachers from the Earth Science Education Unit (ESEU).

== History ==
Earth Learning Idea was set up in May 2007, for the International Year of Planet Earth, with the intention of reaching as many children throughout the world as possible, particularly those who suffer from lack of resources and from lack of thought-provoking teaching. The aim is to foster a better knowledge of the natural world and how it works, encouraging the joy of knowledge about the Earth in those who may not otherwise have the opportunity to receive it.

== Global educational project ==
Earth Learning Ideas enhance learning by being fun to carry out and so enjoyable for pupils and teachers. All ELIs are directed at teachers to encourage maximum pupil participation. One of the main aims is to encourage interactive teaching and the development of thinking and investigational skills in pupils. It is a global effort offering unique teaching resources. All activities are free to download in pdf format and all are accompanied by ´back-up´ notes for teachers.

The activities range widely from ´Rock cycle in wax´, ´Craters on the Moon´ to ´Quakeshake´, an investigation into why some buildings survive in an earthquake and others do not. Other popular activities are ´Trapped! Why can't oil and gas escape from their underground prison?´ and ´How to weigh a dinosaur´. ELIs are popular in schools especially when earthquakes, volcanoes or tsunamis have been in the news. A rich collection of exciting and imaginative activities covering a wide range of Earth-related topics can be found on the website.

Each week an activity is posted on the ELI blog. New activities are published here and comments and suggestions are encouraged. The suggestions are incorporated into ´Extension´ ideas for the activities.

At 10 January 2019, more than 4,000,000 activities in PDF format have been downloaded worldwide.

== Translations ==
Earth Learning Idea activities are written on a voluntary basis and, with the exception of Norway, they have been translated voluntarily too. The Norwegian team received a small grant. ELI activities are now available in the following languages:-

- Spanish - translations by AulaGEA, a service for teachers and learners of the Dept. of Geology of the University of Buenos Aires.
- Catalan and further Spanish translations - are published by AEPECT, Asociación Española para la enseñanza de las Ciencias de la Tierra: La organización de profesores de Ciencias de la Tierra de España, Portugal e Hispano-América.
- Norwegian - the translations are sponsored by the Norwegian Committee of the Year of Planet Earth and Earth Learning Idea activities are listed as resource material on the Naturfagsenteret website.
- Italian ANISN - translations by members of ANISN Associazione Nazionale degli Insegnanti di Scienze Naturali.
- German - translations supported by the Department for Geography Education, Institute for Science Education, Leibniz University, Hannover.
- Portuguese - translations by members of the Institute of Geosciences, Campinas State University, São Paulo, Brazil.,
- Polish - translations by the Institute of Geology, Faculty of Geographical and Geological Sciences, Adam Mickiewicz University, Poznan, Poland.
- Slovak - translations by the Lepšia Geografia (Better Geography) Project. Bratislava, Slovakia
- Chinese (Mandarin) - translations by members of the Geoidea team.
- Tamil - one translation so far by a member of Arul Anandar College, Tamil Nadu, India.
