= Patricia Steeg =

Cancer researcher

- Education: University of Maryland
- Known for: Discovering the NME1 gene
- Scientific career
- Fields: Breast cancer research
- Workplaces: Center for Cancer Research; National Institute of Dental Research; National Cancer Institute

Patricia Steeg is a cancer researcher working in the field of breast cancer metastasis, and was the first person to discover the NME1 gene, which spreads breast cancer to other parts of the body.

== Education ==
Steeg attended the University of Maryland, which is where she got her PhD in 1982.

== Career ==
Steeg had been the Deputy Chief of the Women’s Malignancies Branch since 2014 at the Center for Cancer Research as well as being the co-director of the Office of Translational Resources for the Center. Steeg was also a recipient of the Jane Coffin Child Memorial Fund for Medical Research Fellowship in the Laboratory of Departmental Biology and Anomalies, as well as the National Institute of Dental Research, and the Laboratory of Pathology at the National Cancer Institute. In 1992, Steeg was also given tenure at the Laboratory of Pathology.

== Research ==
Steeg discovered the NME1 gene by realizing that breast cancer was less likely to spread to other parts of the body in people who had this gene. When the NME1 gene is introduced in highly metastatic breast cancer line it decreased the potential for the cancer to spread anywhere from 50 to 90 percent. The NME1 gene reduces the likelihood of cancer spreading by producing a protein referred to as NME1 protein. This means that cancerous cells will lack this protein, so Steeg and her team synthesized a drug called nitidine analog that will locate cancerous cells and destroy them based on the amount of proteins the cell contains. This drug is less cancerous than chemotherapy, and has shown promise in working against melanoma, colon cancer, and small-cell lung cancer.
