= Lee Fong-mao =

Taiwanese religious and literary studies scholar

Lee Fong-mao (Chinese: 李豐楙; born 10 August 1947) is a Taiwanese religious and literary studies scholar.

== Education ==
Lee earned a Bachelor of Arts in liberal arts within the Department of Chinese Literature at National Taiwan Normal University in 1969. He then pursued a master's degree and a doctorate at National Chengchi University's Department of Chinese literature, completing his M.A. in 1974 and Ph.D. in 1978.

== Career ==
Lee began his teaching career as an associate professor at Providence University's Department of Chinese Literature after graduation. He moved to the same department at his alma mater, NCCU, in 1980, and was promoted to a full professorship in 1987. Lee left National Chengchi University in 1992 to accept a research fellow position with the Institute of Chinese Literature and Philosophy at Academia Sinica. In 2010, Lee returned to the NCCU faculty as chair professor of the Graduate Institute of Religious Studies, and founded the Center for the Study of Chinese Religions there in 2013. When he retired in 2015, Lee was granted emeritus status.

== Honors and awards ==
Lee was elected a member of Academia Sinica in 2022.

== Personal life ==
Lee is a Taoist.
