= Li Kuen-pei =

Taiwanese painter

Li Kuen-pei (Chinese: 李焜培; also Lee Quan-Pui, pinyin: Li Kun-pei; Wade–Giles: Li Kun-pei; 1934 – 25 February 2012) was an art painter from the Republic of China (Taiwan).

== Early life ==
Born in Zhongshan of Guangdong province in China, war forced him to relocate as a child to Macau and then to Hong Kong, where he attended and graduated from the Fong Lam Middle School. He moved to Taiwan in 1955 and studied at the Department of Fine Arts, then Taiwan Provincial Teachers College (now National Taiwan Normal University), where he was mentored by Ma Pai-shui and graduated in 1959.

== Career ==
After Li graduated, he taught at the Chiayi Senior High School for a year then returned to Hong Kong to teach. In 1968, he was invited by Huang Chun-pi, then Department Chair of the Department of Fine Arts at the National Taiwan Normal University, and began teaching watercolor at the university before retiring in 1999.

== Later Years and Death ==
In his later years, he was diagnosed with Parkinson's disease, which resulted in paralysis of his hands and consequently ended his ability to create art. He received care from his wife, Ms. Liang Tan-pei, and died on 25 February 2012 in Taipei.
