= C. Kent Osborne =

American oncologist

Charles Kent Osborne is the former Director of the Dan L. Duncan Cancer Center at Baylor College of Medicine. He earned his AB and MD from the University of Missouri in Columbia, MO. He completed his residency in Internal Medicine at Johns Hopkins Hospital and then went on to a fellowship in Medical Oncology at the National Cancer Institute.

Osborne has authored more than 400 papers on the biology and treatment of breast cancer.

== Honors and awards ==
- Komen Brinker Award for Scientific Distinction, 1995

== Publications ==
- Harris, Jay R; Lippman, Marc E; Monica Morrow; & C. Kent Osborne, (2004) Diseases of the Breast, Lippincott Williams & Wilkins, ISBN 0-7817-4619-1
