= Chen Den-wu =

Taiwanese historian

- 陳登武
- Born: 1964 (age 61–62)
- Occupation: Historian
- Employer: National Taiwan Normal University

Chen Den-wu (Chinese: 陳登武; pinyin: Chén Dēngwǔ; born 1964) is a Taiwanese historian from Zhushan, Nantou. He has been the chairman of the Department of History, the vice president for academic affairs, and the director of the Center for General Education at National Taiwan Normal University.

Chen is a full-time professor of the Department of History at National Taiwan Normal University. His studies focus on the history of the Sui dynasty, the Tang dynasty, the Six dynasties, the rule of law in China, and visual history. His broad interests outside education and research include hiking and bird watching. Chen cares about the natural environment, the biological system, society, culture, history, and life in general.

== Positions ==
- Dean, the Department of History, National Taiwan Normal University. August 2010-August 2013
- Full-time Professor, Dean, the Department of History, National Taiwan Normal University. August 2010-August 2013
- Visiting Scholar, the Institute for Advanced Studies in Humanities and Social Sciences, National Taiwan University.
- Secretary General, Taiwanese Legal History Association.
- Visiting Scholar, Institute of History and Philology, Academia Sinica. 2006

== Research ==
Chen focuses his studies mainly on the legal history of China, visual history, and the history of the Sui dynasty and the Tang dynasty. He has written the From the Human World to the Unknown Realm (《從人間世到幽冥界》) in 2007 to investigate the legal issues throughout the history of China. He extends the studies of law from legal orders to religions and beliefs, which demonstrate the rule of the state against earthly crimes in the form of a judgment in hell.

From the diverse perspectives in and insights into the studies of the legal history in China, Chen focuses mainly on how royal powers consolidate its political power through its ways of ruling to maintain social order. Chen’s book covers the crime issues and the legal systems of this world and the judgment in hell of the unknown world to discuss the aspects of the legal systems in the Tang dynasty. His main concerns include investigating the actual practice of the litigation system in the Tang dynasty, the corresponding practices and social security demonstrated through individual criminal cases, and the ways in which religions and beliefs are mobilized to decrease criminal rate and to gain social control during the process of law making on a national level.

Chen has also been interested in the ways in which states rule in ancient China. That led him to publish Hell, Law, and World Order—the Religions, Society, and States in Ancient China in 2009 to investigate the relationships among religions, society, and states in ancient China. In recent years Chen has been studying the “judging” in the Tang dynasty and has published several academic papers on the “Hundred Ways of Judging” by Bai Juyi

Meanwhile, Chen is also interested in the issues regarding “history and life.” He has been invited by the San Min Book Co., Ltd. (三民書局) to write “History and Life.” He believes there is subject that knows no boundary, limit, or a defined topic. It has no boundary because with all the facets of life anything could be used as a boundary. It has no limit because history could be traced back infinitely. It has no defined topic because of the multifaceted life and infinite history the book could address and discuss. Therefore, all historians could end up with their own version of “History and Life.” “History and Life” is a lifelong topic to write about.

All lives end at one time or another, while the wheel of history rolls on. The entanglement between history and life reminds people of such a universal topic. According to Eric Hobsbawm, if the proposition of “he should wear clothes” is hidden behind The Emperor’s New Clothes by Hans Christian Andersen, there should be a certain knowledge that human should possess as self-evident as the emperor should wear clothes. Eric Hobsbawm believes that knowledge should be history. He believes that even laymen could tell that social science and history studies both need history to explain how modern world and social system are formed. It also allows us to conduct all kinds of social studies more analytically. He emphasizes that “all peoples have a history.” The value of “history” is no limited to the “function” under pragmatism or power struggles. The purpose and function of history is providing more information for the human pursuit of love, hope, and peace. Only with this purpose would the function of history be maximized.
