= International Earth Science Olympiad =

Annual competition for secondary school students

The International Earth Science Olympiad (IESO), one of the senior International Science Olympiads, is an annual international Earth science competition for secondary school students. Participants are tested across the major areas of Earth science, including geology, geophysics, meteorology, oceanography, terrestrial astronomy, and environmental science.

The IESO is one of the major activities of the International Geoscience Education Organization (IGEO), which is affiliated with and sponsored by the International Union of Geological Sciences (IUGS). Its stated aims include raising student interest and public awareness of Earth science, enhancing Earth science education, promoting international cooperation in Earth science education, and encouraging friendly relationships among young people from different countries.

Students participate as members of national delegations selected through their respective national selection systems. The international competition includes individual theoretical and practical examinations as well as cooperative international activities. These include the International Team Field Investigation (ITFI), in which students from different national delegations work together on field-based scientific investigations, and the Earth Systems Project (ESP), in which multinational teams investigate an Earth systems topic and present their findings. The cooperative components are intended to encourage international cooperation and friendship among students of different nationalities and backgrounds.

== Format and scoring ==
The Aosta Valley in northwestern Italy, one of the regions used for field activities during the 2026 IESO.

The format of the IESO consists of individual examinations and international team activities. The individual competition includes written or theoretical examinations and practical examinations. The theoretical examinations assess participants' knowledge, understanding, reasoning and analytical skills across the major fields of Earth science, while the practical examinations assess their ability to conduct scientific investigations, interpret observations and data, and apply Earth science concepts to laboratory or field-based problems.

The exact format of the competition may vary between editions. The host country's scientific and examination committees prepare the examinations within the framework of the IESO syllabus and statutes. As a result, the number and division of written and practical examinations, the types of practical tasks, and the locations in which field examinations are conducted may differ from year to year.

For example, the 2026 IESO in Turin, Italy, included theoretical examinations and practical activities, including field-based Earth science investigations. The practical and field program made use of geological sites in Piedmont, the Aosta Valley and the western Alps.

Individual rankings are determined from participants' performance in the written and practical examinations. Under the IESO statutes, approximately 10% of participants receive gold medals, 20% receive silver medals and 30% receive bronze medals. Honourable mentions may also be awarded to participants who do not receive an individual medal but demonstrate particularly strong performance in part of the competition.

In addition to the individual competition, the IESO includes two international team activities: the International Team Field Investigation (ITFI) and the Earth Systems Project (ESP). In the ITFI, students from different national delegations work together on an Earth science investigation involving observations, data collection, interpretation and presentation of their findings. The ESP similarly places participants into multinational teams to investigate and present a topic using an Earth systems approach. The ITFI and ESP are evaluated separately from the individual examinations and have their own team awards.

== History ==
The IESO was first suggested and started by Korean earth scientists. In 2003, the Korean Earth Science Society (KESS) organized the inaugural Korean Earth Science Olympiad. The international competition was adopted as one of the major activities of the International Geoscience Education Organization (IGEO) later that year.

In November 2004 in Seoul, representatives from ten countries gathered to discuss the curriculum and the format of IESO. 23 presentations were made and the IESO Advisory Committee was established with members including Chairperson Moo Young Song, Hendra Amijaya, Roberto Greco, Ken-ichiro Hisada, Thomas Lorillard Tailer, Chang Chun-Yen, Miguel Cano, Shankar Rajasekharaiah, and Chan-Jong Kim. The IESO Syllabus Commission was then developed in 2005, and the first International competition was held in 2007.

The first IESO was held in October 2007 in Daegu, South Korea, where the Chinese Taipei team won first place with three gold medals and one silver medal. The Korean team placed second with one gold and three silver medals, the United States followed in third with two silver and two bronze medals, and India was placed fourth with two silver medals.

The second IESO (2008) took place in Manila and Bicol, Philippines, with the theme "Cooptition in Addressing Climate Change" (the word "cooptition" refers to a combination of competition and cooperation). Its aim was to promote global Earth science education and international cooperation in mitigating anthropogenic harm to the environment.

The third IESO took place in Taipei, in September 2009 with the theme "Human Environment".

In 2010, 19 countries arrived in Yogyakarta, Indonesia to compete at the Fourth IESO, and the International Team Competition focus on sustainability and the use of underground water. This was followed by the 5th IESO in 2011 held in Modena, Italy, where students, mentors, and observers from 34 countries participated. In the succeeding 2012 IESO edition, 17 countries were represented in Argentina. The 2013 IESO was held in Mysore, India, and in 2014, in Santander, Spain.

The logo of the 2017 International Earth Science Olympiad.

The 2015 IESO took place in Poços de Caldas, Minas Gerais, Brazil. 31 countries participated in IESO 2016 in Mie Prefecture, Japan. In 2017, the International Earth Science Olympiad was hosted by France.

The logo of the 2018 International Earth Science Olympiad.

The 2018 IESO was hosted by Thailand on the Mahidol University campuses. The United States won first place in both the 2018 and 2019 IESO. In 2018, the United States won four gold medals, the first time the United States had won any gold medals in its history of competing in the IESO. In 2019, the United States won two gold and two silver medals.

The 2020 IESO was canceled due to the COVID-19 pandemic. In 2021, the IESO was entirely virtual with a modified format. Each country was allowed a team of eight students who may compete in one or more activities. The IESO consisted of six activities: the Data Mining Test (DMT), the National Team Field Investigation (NTFI), the Earth Systems Project (ESP), Mission to Mars, the Earth Systems Pledge, and IESO Art and Science. Competitive activities were graded as Excellent, Very Good, or Good.

== Selection Process ==
Selection processes for teams represented at the IESO vary from country to country. In China, students are selected through the Chinese Earth Science Olympiad (CESO), which consists of regional preliminary rounds followed by a national final. Gold medalists in the national competition may be selected for the national training team, from which members of the Chinese IESO team are chosen based on their performance during training and interviews. Participation in national selection processes can be substantial. In the 2025–2026 competition cycle, more than 76,000 students took part in the preliminary selection for the Chinese Earth Science Olympiad.

In Australia, students begin with the Earth and Environmental Science division of the Australian Science Olympiad Exam. High-performing eligible students may be invited to the Australian Science Olympiad Summer School at the Australian National University, where further training and assessments are conducted. Four students are ultimately selected to represent Australia at the IESO and undergo additional training before the international competition.

In the United States, students begin with the National Open Exam administered by the United States Earth Science Organization (USESO). High-performing students are invited to the USESO Training Camp, a residential program where participants undertake theoretical and practical examinations, field activities, and team investigations. At the conclusion of the camp, four students are selected for the U.S. Earth Science Team based on their performance in examinations and team investigations.

Although these selection systems differ in structure and format, each participating country or territory ultimately conducts its own process to select the students who will represent it at the IESO.

== Summary ==
| Number | Year | Host country | Host city | Countries represented | Official competitors (Note: Competitor totals refer to the official competing students reported in the standardized IESO historical data and exclude guest students, observers, and other attendees where these were reported separately.) | Individual champion (Note: The individual champion is the highest-ranked competitor where an overall individual ranking was published. The online editions from 2021 to 2023 used separate activity-based results and did not publish a directly comparable single overall individual champion.) | Theme |
|---|---|---|---|---|---|---|---|
| 1 | 2007 | South Korea | Daegu | 8 | 24 | (Taiwan) Chang Chi-han | Earth for Life, Universe for Future Life |
| 2 | 2008 | Philippines | Manila & Bicol | 7 | 24 | (Taiwan) Kung Te-wei | Cooperation in Addressing Climate Changes |
| 3 | 2009 | Taiwan | Taipei | 17 | 50 | (Taiwan) Hsieh Tsung-Lin | Humans and the Environment |
| 4 | 2010 | Indonesia | Yogyakarta | 19 | 63 | (Taiwan) Yang Hung-yi | The Present is the Key to the Future |
| 5 | 2011 | Italy | Modena | 34 | 104 | (South Korea) Sangwoo Yu | Earth Science Renaissance: Science, Environment and Art |
| 6 | 2012 | Argentina | Olavarría | 19 | 66 | (South Korea) Kim Dong-hwan | Energy, Water, and Minerals for Sustainable Development |
| 7 | 2013 | India | Mysore | 27 | 90 | (Thailand) Sirawich Pipatprathanporn | The Earth is but One Family |
| 8 | 2014 | Spain | Santander | 24 | 82 | (Taiwan) I-Kai Chen | Sea and Mountains |
| 9 | 2015 | Brazil | Poços de Caldas | 27 | 85 | (South Korea) Jeong Seung-won | Soil |
| 10 | 2016 | Japan | Mie | 29 | 100 | (Taiwan) Huang Jia-Guan | Our Future: Earth & Space |
| 11 | 2017 | France | Côte d'Azur | 34 | 108 | (China) Xinchen Wei | Standing on the Earth, Gazing at the Planets |
| 12 | 2018 | Thailand | Kanchanaburi | 38 | 139 | (South Korea) Lee Joo-hyung | Earth Science for All |
| 13 | 2019 | South Korea | Daegu | 43 | 163 | (South Korea) Kim Ji-hoon | Passion for Earth Science... Continued |
| 14 | 2021 | Russia | Tyumen (Online) | 33 | 185 | — | |
| 15 | 2022 | Italy | Aosta (Online) | 34 | 204 | — | A Cool Inspiration for an Earth Without Mask Against Global Warming |
| 16 | 2023 | No country | Hosted online by International Geoscience Education Organization | 32 | 172 | — | The Past is the key to the Present |
| 17 | 2024 | China | Beijing | 35 | 116 | (China) Wang Yibo | Big Data for Our Earth |
| 18 | 2025 | China | Jining | 31 | 110 | (Taiwan) Yao I-Keng | Confucian Wisdom, Earth's Future — Exploration and Innovation |
| 19 | 2026 | Italy | Turin | 40+ | 151 | (Japan) Yoshihisa Kawakami | From the Heroic Geology of Quintino Sella to the Geoscientists of the Future |
| 20 | 2027 | Japan | Matsue | — | — | — | |
| 21 | 2028 | Canada | Calgary | — | — | — | |

== Mary Anning Medal Award ==
The Mary Anning Medal Award for Excellence in the Data Mining Test is awarded to the highest scoring female students at each IESO, based on results from the Data Mining Test. It is named after Mary Anning who was a female fossil collector and paleontologist and made significant contributions to the foundations of paleontology. The three female students with the highest scores are awarded the Gold, Silver or Bronze Mary Anning Medal Award.

In 2023 the Gold award was won by Penny Tassicker (Australia), the Silver award was given to Kaitlyn Wang (USA), and the Bronze award was given to Ioana Daria Cristea (Romania).
