= Eva Y.-H. P. Lee =

Taiwanese molecular biologist

Eva Yu-Hua Pan Lee (Chinese: 李潘玉華) is a Taiwanese molecular biologist.

== Education and career ==
Lee earned a bachelor's and a master's degree from National Taiwan Normal University in 1972 and 1979, respectively. She then completed a doctorate in cellular and molecular biology at the University of California, Berkeley, in 1984. As an undergraduate at NTNU, Lee worked as a teaching assistant. While pursuing her doctoral degree, Lee was a research assistant at Lawrence Berkeley Laboratory. Upon graduating from UC Berkeley, Lee accepted a postdoctoral position at the University of California, San Diego, then joined the UCSD faculty in 1988. She taught at the University of Texas Health Science Center at San Antonio from 1991 to 2001, when she joined the University of California, Irvine. At UCI, Lee was affiliated with the Center for Complex Biological Systems, as well as a Chancellor's Professor. Upon retirement, UCI granted Lee emeritus status. She is one of four founding scientists, as well as chairwoman, of GeneTex.

Lee was elected a member of Taiwan's Academia Sinica in 2002.
