= Geoscience education =

Field within science education

Also known as Earth science education, it is the study of Earth's physical features, processes, and systems, as well as the natural and human-induced events that shape it. It involves disciplines like geology, oceanography, meteorology, climatology, environmental science. Geoscience education is a branch of science education that focuses on the teaching and learning of Earth sciences. It contributes to scientific literacy and environmental awareness, and is associated with sustainable development and the training of future geoscientists, educators and policymakers.

The journals on this subject are the Journal of Geoscience education and the Journal of Astronomy and Earth Science Education.

== Geoscience education resources and institutions ==
Geoscience education occurs in formal and informal settings. In addition to classroom-based instruction, learning also takes place in informal environments. Museums, scientific institutions and research groups function as spaces for non-formal education and lifelong learning, providing opportunities for engagement with Earth sciences across different age groups. One example is the Canmore Museum and Geoscience Centre in Canada, which presents exhibits and interactive displays on the geological and cultural history of the Canadian Rockies. The museum includes information on local geology, mining heritage and the history of communities in the region.

Another institution in the field is the Geoscience Australia Education Centre in Australia. This centre offers a range of resources for students and educators, including online tools and interactive exhibits that cover topics such as geology, mineral resources, and natural hazards. The centre also hosts educational programs for students of all ages, including hands-on workshops, guided tours, and outreach activities to schools and community groups.

Other institutions involved in geoscience education include the American Museum of Natural History in the United States, the Geological Survey of Canada, and the British Geological Survey in the United Kingdom and organisations from the Global South such as the Geological Society of South Africa. These organisations contribute to geoscience education through the provision of educational resources, public engagement activities and scientific information..

Geoscience Education Research Groups have been established around the world to address the challenges facing geoscience education and to improve the effectiveness of teaching methods. These groups bring together geoscientists, educators, and researchers to explore how to engage and motivate students to learn about the Earth and its complex systems. They conduct research to identify best practices in geoscience education, develop innovative teaching methods and materials, and evaluate the effectiveness of different approaches. These groups are supported by national and international geoscience organizations and have made significant contributions to advancing the field of geoscience education. The University of South Carolina's research groups at the Geoscience Department, for example, investigates new geoscience teaching methods and curricula, while the University of Canterbury's Geoscience Education research group focuses on geoscience education in the context of sustainability and climate change.

Several organisations contribute to geoscience education, including the Commission on Geoscience Education of IUGS (COGE) of the International Union of Geological Sciences (IUGS), which administers the Chris King Medal for Excellence in Geoscience Education. Additional organisations include the International Geoscience Education Organisation (IGEO) and the American Geophysical Union (AGU), which supports geoscience education research through its Geoscience Education Research Working Group.

== Importance of geoscience education and future directions ==
Geoscience education is a crucial component of understanding our planet and its complex systems. Educating young people about the diverse career opportunities and providing them with resources on geoscience is essential to sustain the industry and support the transition within the workforce. In this regard, some organizations such as the Australian Geosciences Council regularly publish reports on the state of Geoscience Education worldwide. Additionally, the Wuhan Consensus is an initiative that emphasizes the importance of promoting the habitability of the Earth through education, in response to increasing threats to the planet caused by climate change, environmental pollution, and ecological damage. The Consensus advocates for a renewed perception and definition of humanity's role in the world, calling for concerted actions from global universities, research institutions, primary and secondary schools, and all sectors of society to implement the new geoscience education and promote harmonious co-existence between man and nature. As such, the future of Geoscience education must focus on preparing the next generation of geoscientists, policymakers, educators, and citizens to address the pressing environmental challenges facing the world today.

== Challenges faced by Geoscience educators worldwide ==
One of the biggest challenges is raising awareness of the importance of geoscience education. While the majority of countries have compulsory geoscience education in their curricula, more efforts are needed to increase the availability of optional geoscience courses, particularly for students aged 16-18.

Another challenge is the lack of support from national and international geoscience organizations, which could improve geoscience education. Increased funding and infrastructure are also necessary to provide students with necessary resources and tools to succeed in geoscience education. Continued efforts are necessary to promote geoscience education and increase its accessibility, resources, and funding to prepare the next generation of geoscientists to address the environmental challenges facing the world today.
