= European Olympiad in Artificial Intelligence =

Regional secondary-school AI competition

The European Olympiad in Artificial Intelligence (EUROAI), also referred to as the Central European Olympiad in Artificial Intelligence (CEOAI), is a regional science olympiad in artificial intelligence for secondary school students, organized by the Nitro Association. Its first edition was hosted in July 2026 by Babeș-Bolyai University in Cluj-Napoca, Romania, in partnership with the Cluj County School Inspectorate and Romania's Ministry of Education and Research.

Each accredited country selects a national team of up to four students, accompanied by a team leader, a deputy leader and any number of observers, through its own national AI competition or selection process. The competition itself is an individual competition held over two contest days, testing both theoretical understanding and practical machine learning ability; students are required to train their own models rather than use pre-trained or off-the-shelf systems.

== History ==
The name EUROAI was chosen as a reference to the Central European Olympiad in Informatics (CEOI), an established regional programming olympiad known for the difficulty of its problem sets; CEOAI describes itself as following a similar philosophy.

Artificial intelligence became an Olympic discipline only recently, with the first dedicated world competitions in the field held in 2024. The first edition of CEOAI was hosted from 14 to 19 July 2026 by Babeș-Bolyai University's Faculty of Mathematics and Computer Science in Cluj-Napoca, Romania, in partnership with the Cluj County School Inspectorate and Romania's Ministry of Education and Research. The event opened on 15 July 2026 at UBB's Auditorium Maximum, with over 200 students from 32 countries taking part, according to AGERPRES, Romania's national press agency.

Independent press reported that the opening ceremony's attendees included academic and government representatives, delegates from Romania's Presidential Administration, and members of the international artificial intelligence community, among them John Shawe-Taylor, UNESCO Chair for Artificial Intelligence at University College London and president of the International Artificial Intelligence Olympiad (IAIO).

Coverage of the first edition noted that Romanian students had, at that point, won a cumulative 27 medals (two gold, ten silver, and 15 bronze) across the two editions of the International Olympiad in Artificial Intelligence held to date, a record cited by press as placing Romania among the field's more consistently competitive countries.

For the host nation, selection of the Romanian team is conducted through the national "ROAI" competition, which also serves as Romania's selection process for the International Olympiad in Artificial Intelligence.

=== Competition platform ===
CEOAI's competition rounds run on Nitro AI Judge, an open-source competitive AI platform built and maintained by the Nitro Association, which is also used for Romania's ROAI national selection. Countries may use the platform to run their own preparation contests or national selections free of charge.

== Members ==
Countries recognized by the Council of Europe participate as full members with voting rights in the Olympiad's General Assembly.

- Albania, selection through STEM Hub Albania
- Bosnia and Herzegovina, selection through CERIT (Centre for Education, Robotics, Innovation and Technology)
- Czech Republic, selection through the Czech AI Olympiad
- Georgia, selection through the Georgian AI Association (GAIA)
- Greece, selection through the Greek AI Olympiad
- Hungary, selection through the Hungarian AI Olympiad
- Iceland, selection through the Icelandic Competitive Programming Association
- North Macedonia, selection through the Computer Society of Macedonia
- Poland, selection through the Polish AI Olympiad
- Moldova, selection through the Moldovan Association of ICT Companies (ATIC)
- Romania, host nation; selection through the Romanian AI Olympiad (ROAI)
- Serbia, selection through the Serbian AI Association (SRB AI)
- Slovakia, selection through the National Institute of Education and Youth (NIVAM)
- Slovenia, selection through ACM Slovenia
- Sweden, selection through the Swedish AI Olympiad
- Turkey, selection through Matematik Eğitimi Koop
- Ukraine, selection through the Ukrainian AI Olympiad
- United Kingdom, selection through the UK Olympiad in Artificial Intelligence (UKOAI)

== Guest countries ==
Countries not recognized as European by the Council of Europe, along with any European country not yet holding full membership, participate as guests. Guests may attend General Assembly meetings without voting rights, and their students compete under the same conditions and are eligible for the same medals as full members.

- Algeria, selection through the Algerian AI Olympiad
- Bulgaria, selection coordinated through the Ministry of Education and Science
- Cyprus, selection coordinated through Neapolis University Pafos
- Estonia, selection through the Estonian AI Olympiad
- France, selection through the French AI Olympiad
- Iran, selection through the Ministry of Education's Young Scholars Club
- Kazakhstan, selection through the Kazakhstan Competitive Programming Federation
- Latvia, selection through Lemon AI
- Malaysia, selection through the Malaysian AI Olympiad
- Puerto Rico, selection through the University of Puerto Rico at Mayagüez's Office of International Programs
- Rwanda, selection through the Rwanda Computing Association
- United Arab Emirates, selection through Neurora
- Vietnam, selection through RIVA Global

== Results ==
The competition awarded medals to contestants who exceeded score thresholds derived from full member country rankings; remote and guest contestants who reached the same score ranges also received medals, though only full member contestants received an official numbered ranking. In total, 51 of the roughly 215 competitors were awarded medals: 8 gold, 22 silver, and 21 bronze.

The highest individual score, 323 out of 600, was achieved by Roman Mielamud of Ukraine, who placed first overall. As host, Romania fielded two teams beyond its officially ranked entry; these additional Romanian contestants competed under guest status and were not included in the official numbered rankings, though they remained eligible for medals.

=== Medal table (member countries) ===
The table below reflects medals won by member-country contestants only.

| Country | Gold | Silver | Bronze | Total |
|---|---|---|---|---|
| Sweden | 2 | 2 | 0 | 4 |
| Ukraine | 2 | 0 | 0 | 2 |
| Poland | 1 | 3 | 0 | 4 |
| Georgia | 1 | 2 | 1 | 4 |
| United Kingdom | 0 | 1 | 1 | 2 |
| Serbia | 0 | 1 | 0 | 1 |
| North Macedonia | 0 | 0 | 3 | 3 |
| Slovenia | 0 | 0 | 3 | 3 |
| Greece | 0 | 0 | 2 | 2 |
| Hungary | 0 | 0 | 1 | 1 |
| Slovakia | 0 | 0 | 1 | 1 |
| Turkey | 0 | 0 | 1 | 1 |
| Total | 6 | 9 | 13 | 28 |

Source: Official CEOAI 2026 results.

== See also ==
- International Olympiad in Artificial Intelligence
- Central European Olympiad in Informatics
- International Science Olympiad
- Competitive programming
