= BRICS+ International Olympiad in Mathematics =

International mathematics competition

- Status: Active
- Genre: Mathematics competition
- Frequency: Annually
- Venue: Various (hosted by member countries)
- Inaugurated: 2025
- Most recent: 2025
- Participants: 131–136 students from 14 countries

The BRICS+ International Olympiad in Mathematics is an annual international mathematics competition for pre-university students, organized under the framework of the BRICS+ cooperation mechanism. The inaugural edition was held in September 2025 in Kazan, Russia, as part of the First Youth Festival of BRICS Countries.

== Format ==
The competition in its inaugural edition consisted of two days of contests, featuring both individual and team components. The Olympiad also included an Informatics component, with some competitions held in a cross-disciplinary team format combining mathematics and computer science. The working language of the competition was English, which served as an additional challenge for participants.

== Participation ==
The 2025 Olympiad brought together 131 to 136 schoolchildren from grades 8 to 12, representing 14 countries. Participating nations included:

- Russia
- Belarus
- Kazakhstan
- Uzbekistan
- Egypt
- Turkey
- China
- Brazil
- India
- South Africa
- Iran
- Ethiopia
- Indonesia

== Awards ==
At the 2025 event, awards were presented for both individual and team performances. In the team standings, four teams received gold medals (two from Russia and two from Kazakhstan), silver medals went to teams from China, Turkey, and Belarus, and bronze prizes were awarded to teams from India, Indonesia, China, Belarus, Uzbekistan, and Russia.

Individual winners included gold medalist Mikhail Stasovsky from Russia and gold medalist Guo Peilin from China.

== History ==
The first BRICS+ International Olympiad in Mathematics was held on September 23–24, 2025, at Kazan Federal University, coinciding with the First Youth Festival of BRICS Countries. The competition was hosted by the university and the city of Kazan.

== See also ==
- International Mathematical Olympiad
- International Science Olympiad
- BRICS
