= Bessen/Hunt technique =

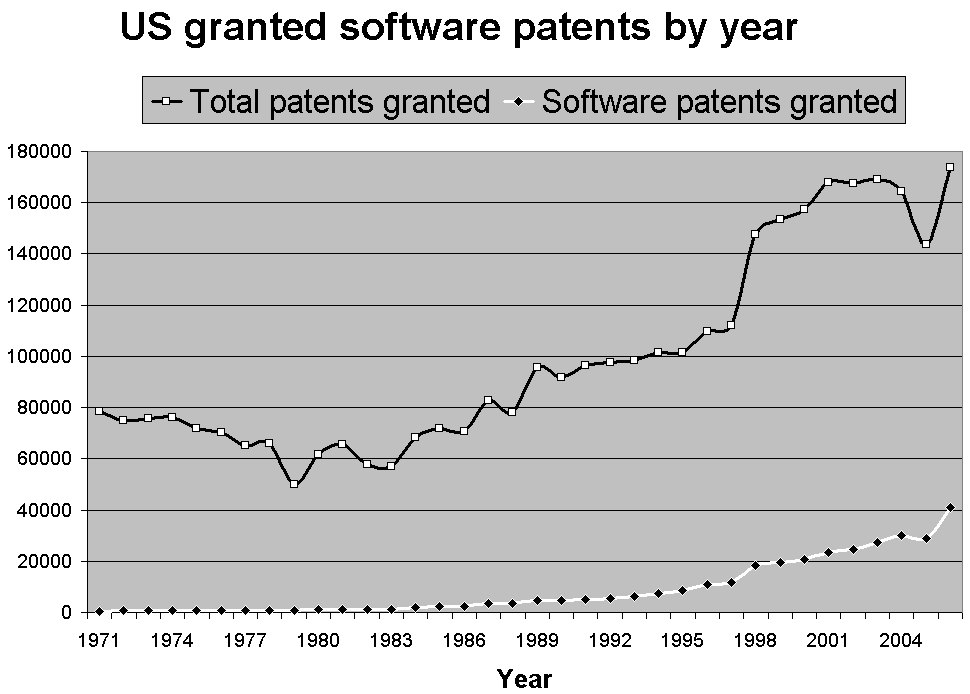
Graph of the number of software patents (per Bessen/Hunt 2004) relative to the total number of patents granted by the USPTO since 1971

The Bessen/Hunt technique is a way of identifying software patents within the patent database of the United States Patent and Trademark Office (USPTO) by using keyword searching. It was proposed by James Bessen and Robert M. Hunt in a 2004 working paper discussing the impact of software patents on research and development.

== Publication ==
Bessen and Hunt's working paper was published in 2004 while the debate in Europe concerning the proposed directive on the patentability of computer-implemented inventions was ongoing and received attention from various commentators.

The completed paper was published in 2007 but has not received the same attention.

== Details ==
The technique proposed by Bessen and Hunt involves conducting a keyword search within the USPTO patent database as follows:

(("software" in specification) OR ("computer" AND "program" in specification))
AND (utility patent excluding reissues)
ANDNOT ("chip" OR "semiconductor" OR "bus" OR "circuit" OR "circuitry" in title)
ANDNOT ("antigen" OR "antigenic" OR "chromatography" in specification)

An actual query that may be submitted to the USPTO database to retrieve patents granted in 2005 is as follows:

ISD/(1/1/2005->1/1/2006)
AND SPEC/(software OR (computer AND program))
AND APT/1
ANDNOT TTL/(chip OR semiconductor OR bus OR circuit OR circuitry)
ANDNOT SPEC/(antigen or antigenic OR chromatography)

== Proponents ==
This technique is used by the Public Patent Foundation to track software patents granted by the USPTO and shows that the number of software patents being granted is generally increasing year on year.

== Critics ==
Robert Hahn and Scott Wallsten of the American Enterprise Institute wrote a paper in November 2003 directly criticising the Bessen/Hunt technique. Bessen and Hunt wrote a reply in 2004.

A 2006 paper by Michael Noel and Mark Schankerman of the London School of Economics and Political Science also mentions the Bessen/Hunt technique and suggests that keyword searching can be difficult since many patent applications may contain the word software or other related words but not be primarily about software itself. Noel and Schankerman instead define a software patent as any patent classified by the (European) Patent Office in International Patent Classification G06F ('Electric Digital Data Processing').

== See also ==
- List of software patents
- Software patents
- Software patent debate
