= International Economics Olympiad =

International competition in economics for high school students

International Economics Olympiad (IEO)
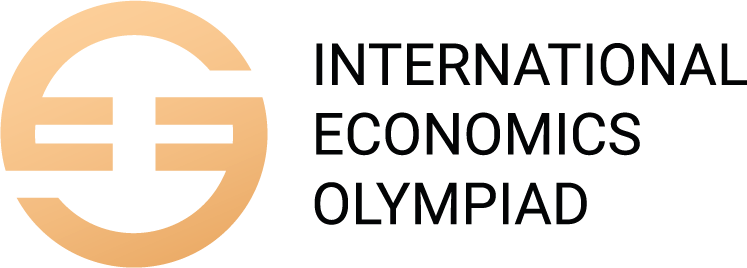

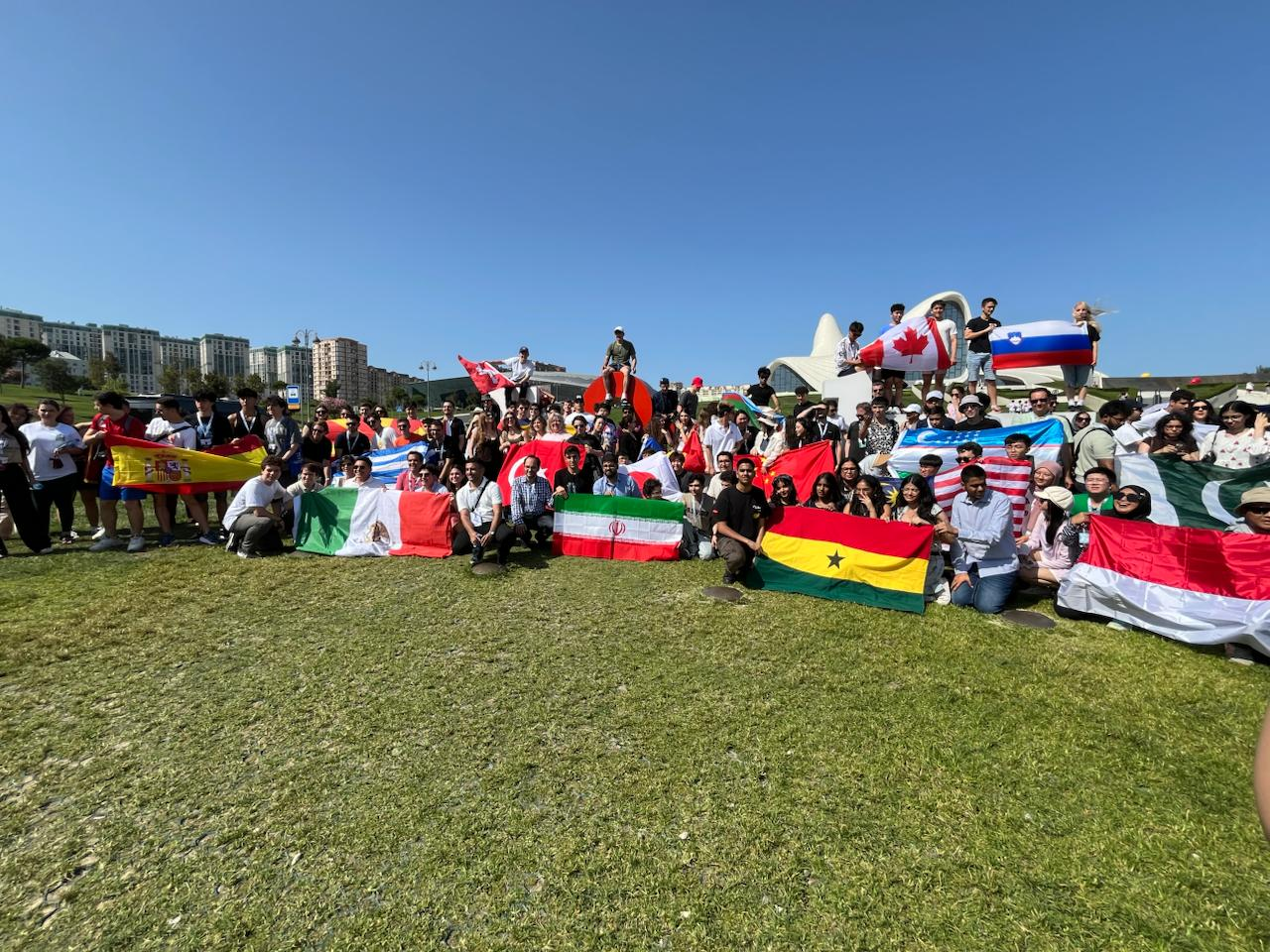
- Teams at the Heydar Aliyev Center, Baku, in IEO 2025.
- Begins: 2018
- Frequency: Annual
- Previous event: China (IEO 2026)
- Next event: Japan (IEO 2027)
- Participants: Over 60 countries
- Website: ieo-official.org

The International Economics Olympiad (IEO) is an annual global competition in economics, business, and finance for high school students, founded in 2018. It is one of the most prestigious economics competitions globally. Participating countries can send a team of up to five students along with one or two team leaders. The students are evaluated in Economics, Finance, and business case analysis. Over sixty countries participate in IEO.

== History ==
The Olympiad was first held in 2018 in Moscow, Russia, with participation from 13 countries. The number of countries increased significantly at the second edition in 2019 in Saint Petersburg.

In 2020, when the COVID-19 pandemic disrupted most international educational events, the IEO moved to an online format. Organizers introduced a system of remote supervision using 360-degree video and screen-sharing tools to maintain exam integrity. The program continued to include social and cultural activities in virtual form, and this online model was later adopted by several national competitions. The 2021 Olympiad was again conducted online, hosted virtually by Latvia.

From 2022 onward, the IEO began a gradual return to on-site events — initially through a regional gathering held in Turkey during the competition hosted by China, and later through official in-person participation in Volos, Greece, in 2023.

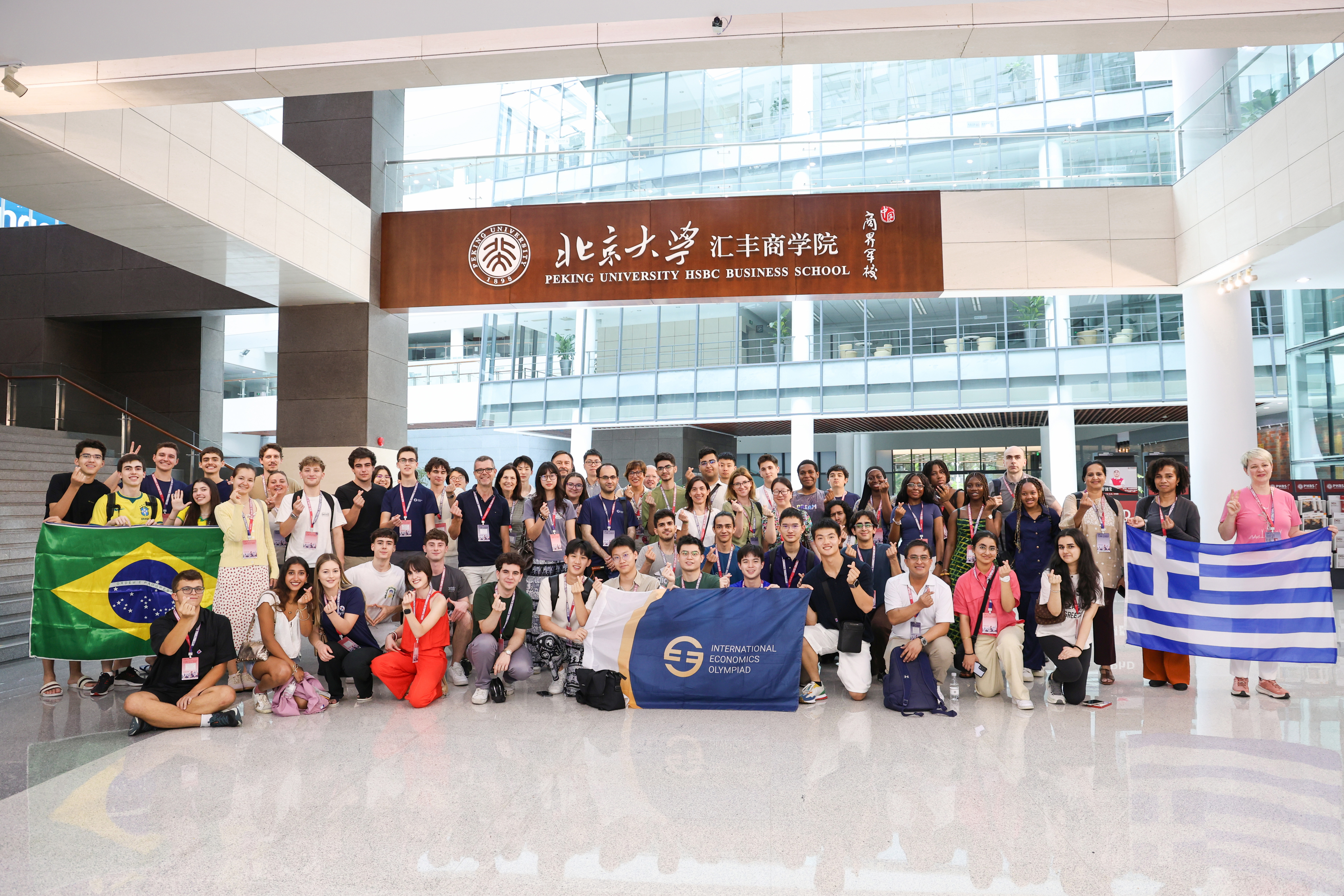
IEO 2026 in China

In 2023, the IEO International Board approved several organisational changes. The Finance component was revised, replacing the interactive investment simulator with a multiple-choice financial literacy test. The Board of Trustees was reorganized into an Advisory Board joined by prominent economists, including Eric Maskin and Daron Acemoglu.

Subsequent events were hosted by China (2022); Volos, Greece (2023); Hong Kong, China (2024); and Baku, Azerbaijan (2025).

The next edition is planned for Tokyo, Japan, in 2027.

Year	Host	Format	Countries/Regions	Participants	Webpage
2018	Moscow, Russia	On-site	13	64	2018.ieo-official.org
2019	Saint Petersburg, Russia	On-site	24	131	2019.ieo-official.org
2020	Astana, Kazakhstan	Online	29	133	2020.ieo-official.org
2021	Riga, Latvia	Online	44	217	2021.ieo-official.org
2022	China	Hybrid	41	201	2022.ieo-official.org
2023	Volos, Greece	Hybrid	47	223	2023.ieo-official.org
2024	Hong Kong,China	Hybrid	50	237	2024.ieo-official.org
2025	Baku, Azerbaijan	Hybrid	52	258	2025.ieo-official.org
2026	Shenzhen, China	On-site	55	263	2026.ieo-official.org
2027	Tokyo, Japan	On-site	TBD	TBD	TBD

== Competition format ==
The IEO consists of two main parts:

- Economics and Finance: an individual written exam assessing students' understanding of basic economic and financial (including financial literacy) concepts and models, ability to apply them, their curiosity about the fields, and analytical skills;
- Business Case: a team round where students analyse a real-world economic or business problem and present solutions.

Tasks are prepared by international academic committees and assessed by an independent jury. The official language of the Olympiad is English.

== Participation and organization ==
Each country is represented by one national team consisting of up to five students and one or two team leaders. Teams are selected through national competitions organised by the sending organisations in each country or territory, whose application was approved by the IEO Executive Board. As of 2026, 74 countries and territories have taken part in the Olympiad.

== Awards ==
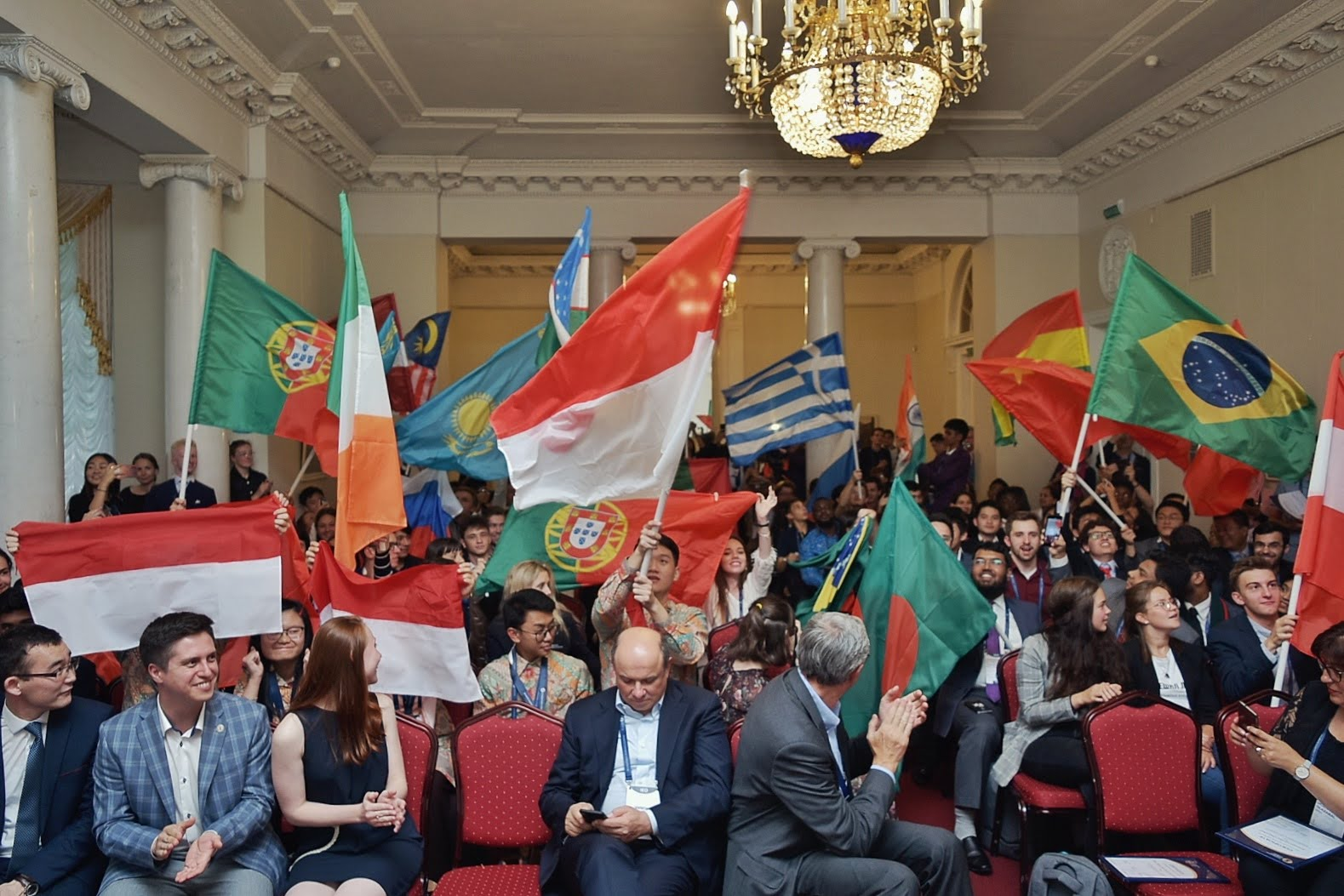
Closing ceremony of IEO 2019

Awards at the IEO are based on the combined results of all three parts of the competition. Individual contestants may receive gold, silver, or bronze medals, which are awarded by the International Board following recommendations from the Jury; the total number of medals cannot exceed half of all invited participants. Teams are ranked separately, and gold, silver, and bronze statuettes are given for overall team performance according to a scoring formula defined in the official syllabus. The Jury may also grant special prizes or certificates for exceptional performance in a specific task or round. All contestants and team leaders receive certificates of participation.

Year	Gold Team Trophy	Silver Team Trophy	Bronze Team Trophy	Absolute Winner
2018	Latvia	Russia	Brazil, Kazakhstan	Vairis Stramkalis (Latvia)
2019	Brazil	China	China	Andrew Pei (China)
2020	Brazil	Indonesia	Russia	Alexander Lutsenko (Russia)
2021	Brazil	Canada	United States	Andy Wei (Canada)
2022	United States	Brazil	Canada	Martin Thaw (Canada)
2023	Brazil	Indonesia	Canada	Daniel Zhang (Canada)
2024	Singapore	Chinese Taipei	Russia	Pathak Pranav (Canada)
2025	Singapore	Canada	China, Russia	Marcus Cheong (Singapore) , Spencer Ong (Singapore)
2026	China	China	Canada	Arthur Spuri (Brazil)

== Notable contributors ==
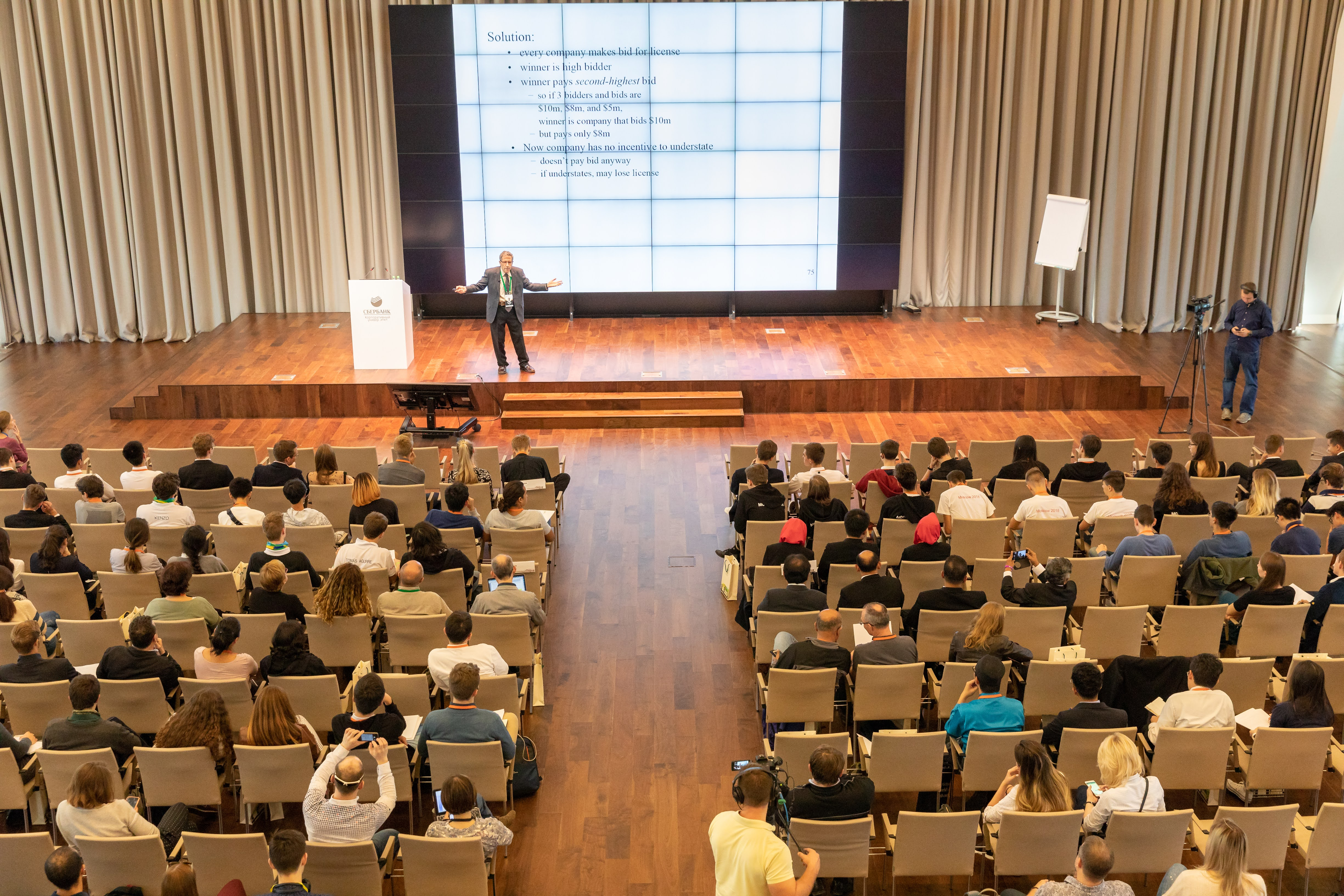
Eric Maskins' lecture at IEO 2018

Economists including Nobel laureates Eric Maskin, Daron Acemoglu and N. Gregory Mankiw have appeared as guest speakers during the Olympiad’s academic program.

== See also ==
- International Mathematical Olympiad
- International Physics Olympiad
- International Olympiad in Informatics
- International Chemistry Olympiad
- International Linguistics Olympiad
- International Olympiad on Astronomy and Astrophysics
- International Science Olympiad
