= International Software Engineering Olympiad PROD =

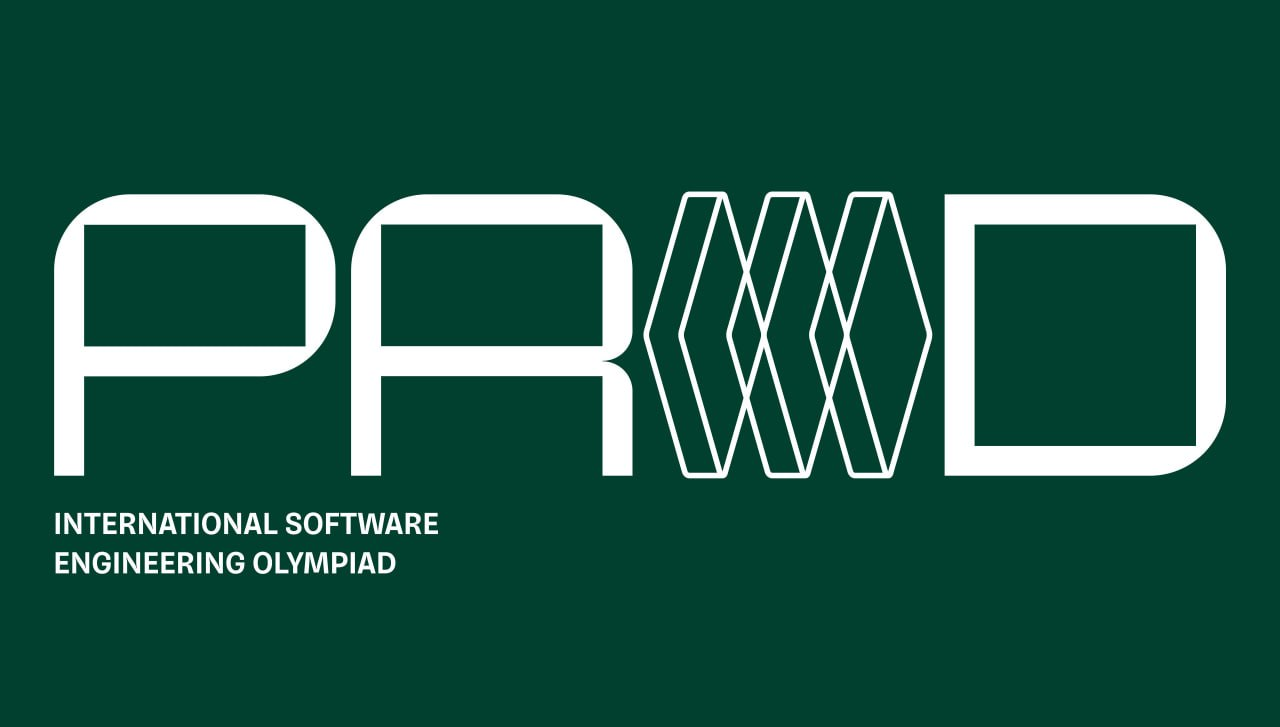
Logo

International Software Engineering Olympiad PROD is an annual academic competition for high school students (grades 8–12) from a broad range of countries. The Olympiad consists of several stages and includes an online examination, as well as team-based development of practical business solutions for major technology companies. Winners are awarded grants and receive advantages in the university admissions process.

== History ==
The Olympiad was first held from January to April 2024. Approximately 4,000 students from Russia, Belarus, Armenia, Kazakhstan, Turkmenistan, and China took part in the qualification round. Forty-three participants were named winners or prize-holders.

The second season was held from December 2024 to March 2025. More than 4,000 Russian-speaking high school students from Russia, Belarus, and 22 additional countries — including the United Kingdom, Germany, France, Canada, and China — participated. A total of 235 students advanced to the final round in Moscow. Finalist teams developed IT products such as a platform for data-analysis competitions, a book-exchange service, a loyalty-program system for a bank's partners, a mentor-matching platform, a film-recommendation service, and a coworking-space booking solution. 17 students were named winners, and 40 additional participants received prizes.

Beginning in 2025, the Olympiad has been conducted in two languages: Russian and English.

The event is organized by Central University and the T-Technologies Group in partnership with the Faculty of Computer Science at HSE University.

== Structure ==
All stages of the Olympiad, except for the final, are conducted online.

- Registration (late October to early December).
- First qualification stage: an online examination assessing foundational knowledge in mathematics and programming (December).
- Second qualification stage: online tasks within one selected track — frontend, backend, mobile development, or MLOps engineering (January).
- Final stage:
  - Individual online round: development of a small-scale project (February).
  - In-person team round: creation and defense of an IT solution in collaboration with teammates and mentors (March).
- Awards ceremony (March).
