= Georgia at International Junior Science Olympiad =

Georgia has participated multiple times in the Olympiad. The country participated as an observer in 2013, and as a participant 4 times in a row between 2016 and 2019 and twice more in 2023 and 2024.

== Selection of Participants ==
Participants are selected by Georgia Young Scientists Union. The way participants are selected is not disclosed, but most of the 6 selected participants (and sometimes, all of them) are always from Georgian-American High School.

== Performance ==
All of the 6 delegations earned at least one medal, but the best result for the country is 2 bronze medals, earned only in 2017.

Results by Year (More info on some years can be seen here:)
Year	2013	2016	2017	2018	2019	2023	2024	Total
Bronze	Participated only as an observer	1	2	1	1	1	1	7
Silver	Participated only as an observer	0	0	0	0	0	0	0
Gold	Participated only as an observer	0	0	0	0	0	0	0
