= Junior Science Olympiad of Canada =

Annual science examination for Canadian students

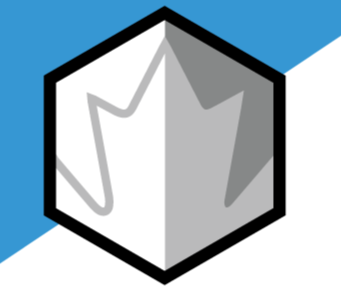
The logo of the Junior Science Olympiad of Canada.

The Junior Science Olympiad of Canada or JSOC is an examination in science for secondary school students, with one test usually conducted in June and a second test in October. Organized by Jennifer Pitt-Lainsbury, Marisca Vanderkamp, Maria Niño-Soto, and Andrew Moffat in association with the University of Toronto Schools (UTS), JSOC encompasses material of the grade 12 curriculum for the three sciences.

The Junior Science Olympiad of Canada targets motivated students ages 15 and under intent on exploring science at a higher level. With curriculum going into grade 11 and 12 science material, the JSOC helps students tackle advanced science and the International Junior Science Olympiad with online supplementary material in biology, chemistry, and physics as well as practical training sessions.

== Mission ==
Below are the mission objectives of the JSOC:

- Enriching science classes with online and practical resources
- Connect science curricula to current real-world issues
- Organize theoretical and practical tests in the three sciences (Chemistry, Physics, and Biology)
- Provide a selection process for Canadian representation at the International Junior Science Olympiad
- Provide comparisons between the science curricula of Canada and that of other IJSO countries
- To nurture girls’ interest in STEM

== Eligibility ==
In order to be eligible to attend the JSOC, one must be a Canadian citizen and be 15 years of age or younger as of December 31 of the competition year. If at any stage the student is found to be not eligible for the exam, they may be disqualified from the program.

Students who wish to compete in the International Junior Science Olympiad (IJSO) on Team Canada must qualify for and write both stages of the JSOC examination in the same year of the competition, as well as meet all IJSO eligibility criteria outlined in the statues of the IJSO. Students who make the final selection for the Canadian IJSO team should participate in a JSOC practical training camp, which will run in the weeks before the competition. Students who are unable to do so must provide evidence of some sort of IJSO level practical training.

== Format ==
The JSOC is split into two stages of selection. Both stages are reviewed and marked thoroughly for errors by an experienced panel of markers and reviewers. The Stage I exam, which takes place in April, lasts 2 hours and contains a total of 45 multiple choice questions spread evenly among Biology, Chemistry, and Physics. The 2020 Stage I exam will take place on April 27.

Students write Stage II of the JSOC selection exam in September. Stage II involves two main parts, written separately over a period of two days. Part 1 is 1.5 hours long and consists of 30 multiple choice questions, 10 in each field, and Part 2 is 2 hours long and is requires full answers to be given, similar to the theoretical portion of the IJSO.

The syllabus covered by the JSOC is detailed on both the JSOC and IJSO websites.

== Qualification ==
The selection for the second stage of the JSOC is based on the following scheme.

To be eligible to get to the next level, i.e. the second stage, it is necessary that a student scores at-least a Minimum Admissible Score (MAS) which is a variable fraction of the maximum score.

The top 10 students or so, drawing from a combination of demonstrated theoretical skills from Stage I of JSOC are then selected to sit for Stage II. This training process, with both theoretical and practical components, is held in the last week of October. The top 6 students are then selected to participate in the International Junior Science Olympiad, the next (2020) edition of which will be hosted in Frankfurt, Germany.

== History ==
After participating as an observer country in the 2017 IJSO, Canada sent its first ever team of 6 contestants to Doha, Qatar, for the 2019 IJSO. There, Canadian contestant Abe Wine achieved first place in both the theoretical portion and the overall exam.
