= International Chemistry Olympiad =

Annual academic competition for high schoolers

The International Chemistry Olympiad (IChO) is an annual academic competition for high school students. It is one of the International Science Olympiads. The first IChO was held in Prague, Czechoslovakia, in 1968. The event has been held every year since then, with the exception of 1971. The delegations that attended the first events were mostly countries of the former Eastern bloc and it was not until 1980, the 12th annual International Chemistry Olympiad, that the event was held outside of the bloc in Austria.

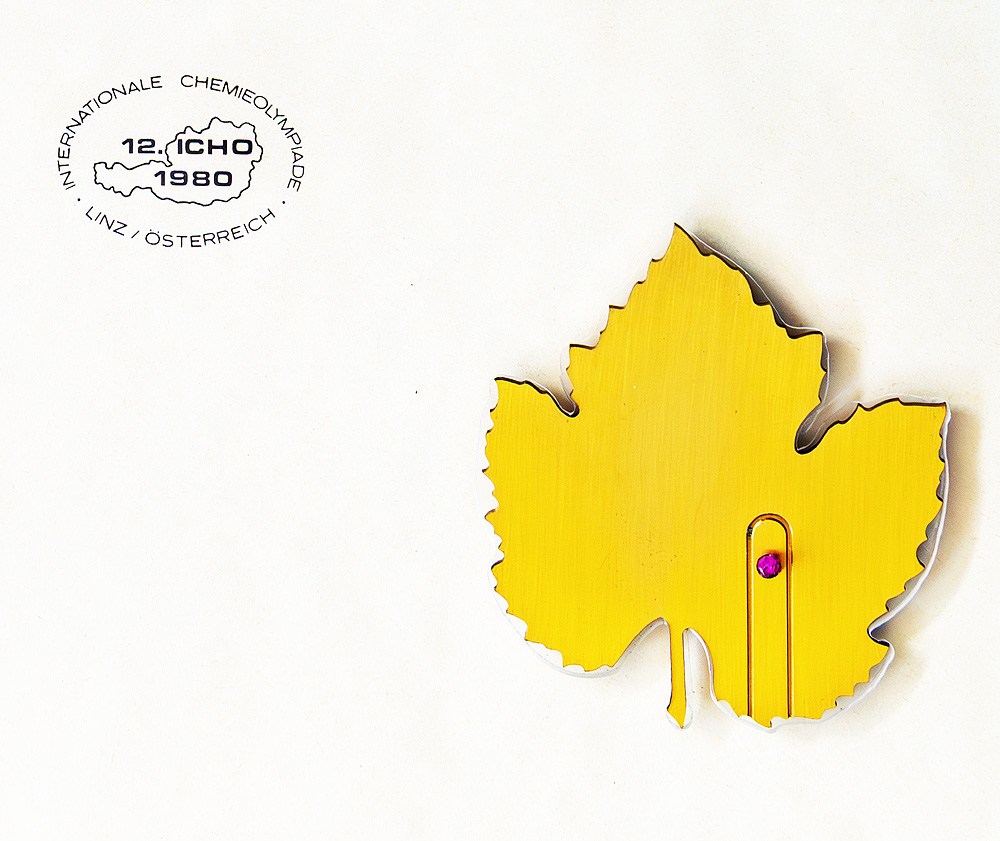

Up to 4 students for each national team compete around July in both a theoretical and an experimental sections, with about half of the participants being awarded medals.

== About ==
The International Chemistry Olympiad (IChO) is an annual competition for the world’s most talented chemistry students at the secondary school level. Nations around the world send a team of four students who are tested on their chemistry knowledge and skills in a five-hour laboratory practical exam and a five-hour written theoretical examination that are held on separate days with the practical examination usually being before the theoretical examination. Countries who wish to participate in the IChO must send observers to two consecutive Olympiads before their students can participate in the event. Presently, around 80 countries participate in the International Chemistry Olympiad.

All participants are ranked based on their individual scores and no official team scores are given. Gold medals are awarded to the top 10-12% of students, silver medals are awarded to the next 20-22% of students, and bronze medals are awarded to the next 30-32% of students. Honorable mentions are awarded to the top 10% of non medalist participants. One special award is given to the student that achieves the highest score overall. Two separate special awards are given to the students who get the best score in the theoretical and practical examinations. Preparation for the International Chemistry Olympiad demands a high level of understanding and interest in chemistry and an outstanding ability to relate chemical subjects with one another as well as with the practical world.

== Structure and rules ==
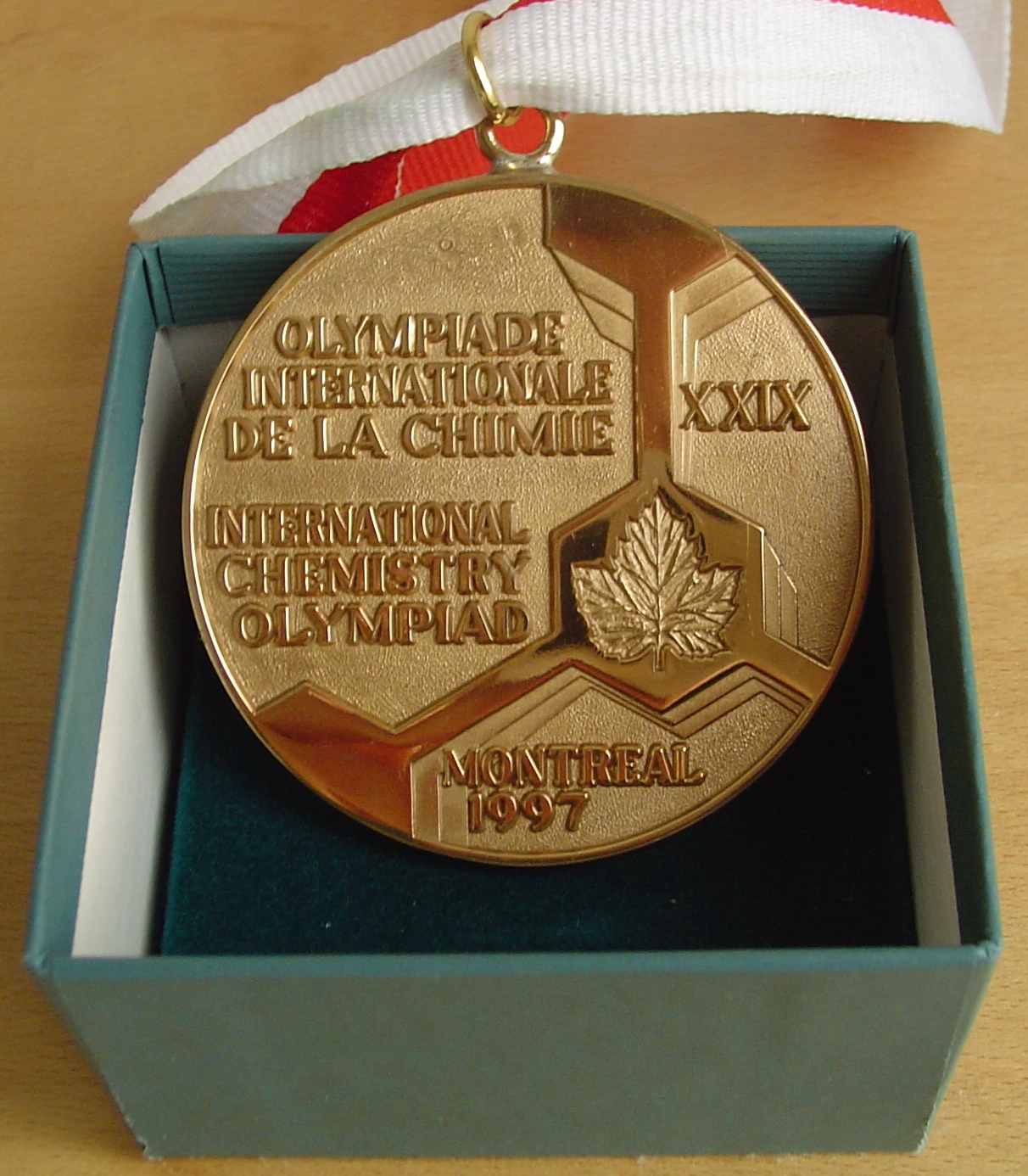
An International Chemistry Olympiad medal for 29th IChO, held at Montreal, Canada

Each delegation consists of up to four students and two mentors (one of them is designated as the head of the delegation or "head mentor"). A delegation may also include a handful of guests and scientific observers. Students must be under the age of 20 and must not be enrolled as regular students in any post-secondary education institution. The International Information Center of the International Chemistry Olympiad is based in Bratislava, Slovakia.

Countries who wish to participate in the IChO must send observers to two consecutive olympiads before their students can participate in the event. A total of 68 countries took part in the 38th IChO in 2006: 67 as participants and 1 as an observer. In 2017 more than 90 countries are expected to send students.

The competition consists of two examinations, a theoretical examination and a practical examination. Both have durations of up to 5 hours, and are held on separate days with the practical examination usually being before the theoretical examination. The theoretical examination has a value of 60 points and the practical examination has a value of 40 points. Each examination is evaluated independently from the other and the sum of the results of the examinations determines a participant's overall result. A scientific jury, which is installed by the host country, suggests the tasks. The international jury, which consists of the 2 mentors from each of the participating countries, discusses the competition tasks and translates them into the language of their students' preference.

Students receive the examinations translated into their languages of preference. It is the duty of the mentors to translate the examinations from English before they are given to the participants. After the examinations are held and evaluated by a committee appointed by the host country and before awards are presented, mentors discuss the evaluation of the exams with judges of the committee to assure fairness in their evaluation. Because the mentors review the examinations before they are given to participants, any communication between the mentors and the students is strictly forbidden prior to the completion of both exams, and the students are required to surrender any mobile phones and laptop computers to the organizer.

The syllabus of the competition contains subjects from several areas of chemistry, including organic chemistry, inorganic chemistry, physical chemistry, analytical chemistry, biochemistry, and spectroscopy. Though some of these subjects are included in most secondary school chemistry programs, for the most part, they are evaluated at a much deeper level and many may require a level of knowledge and understanding comparable to that of post-secondary education. In addition, the host country of each IChO issues a set of preparatory problems well in advance of the competition every year. These preparatory problems cover specific topics in considerably more depth than typical post-secondary education. Preparation for the International Chemistry Olympiad demands a high level of understanding and interest in chemistry and an outstanding ability to relate chemical subjects with one another as well as with the practical world.

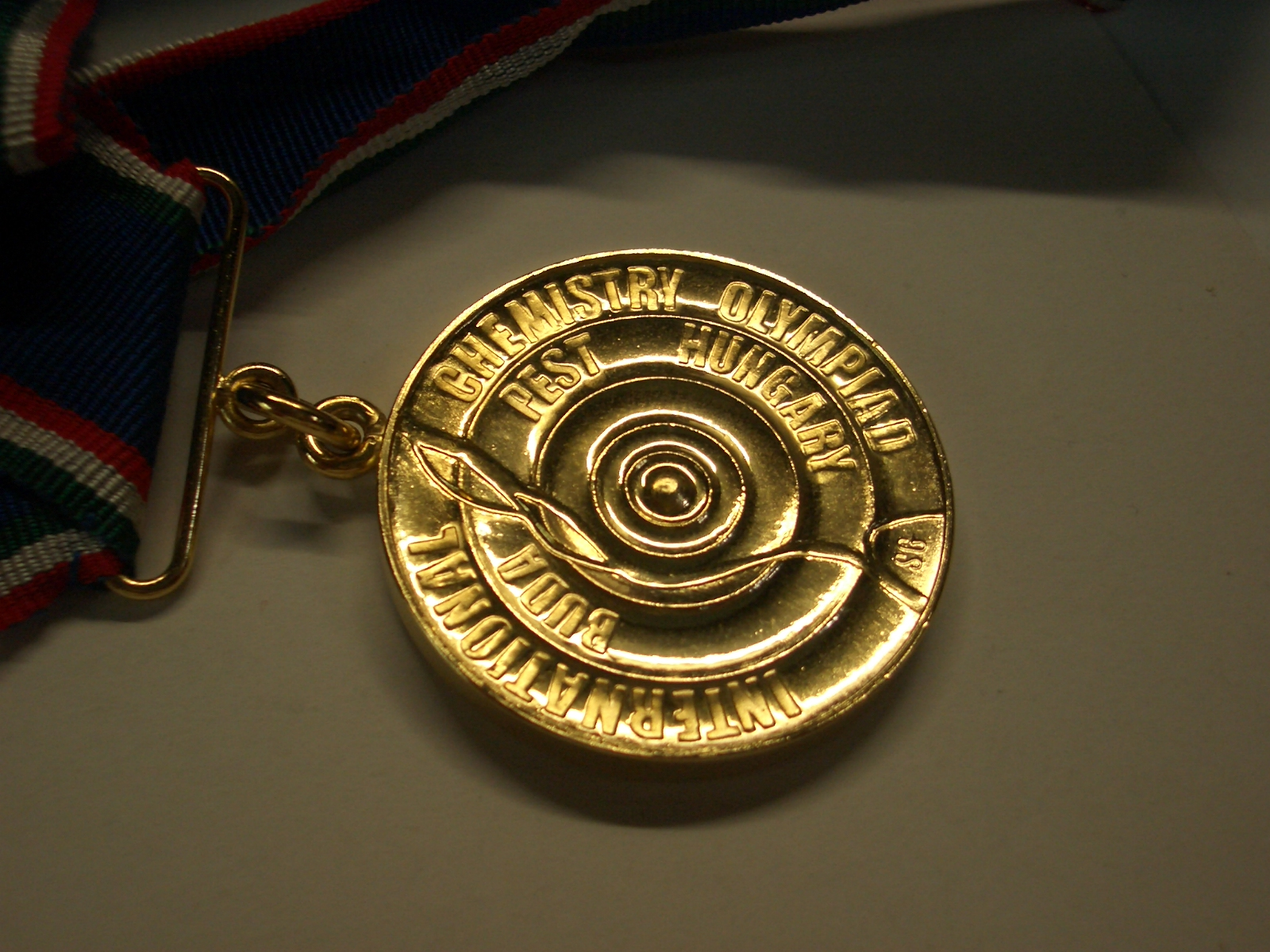
A gold medal from the 40th IChO

These events are also outstanding opportunities for the students to meet people from all around the world who share similar interests, to visit different places, and to get in touch with different cultures. As the aims of the competition establish, the IChO competitions help to enhance friendly relations among young people from different countries; they encourage cooperation and international understanding.

== Preparation ==
Each country is free to choose its team by whatever means it seems appropriate, the selection involves holding regional and national olympiad competitions. Many countries hold "training camps" for its top students, where mentors from the country give the students accelerated college-level courses in chemistry with an emphasis on the topics covered in that year's preparatory problems as well as practical training. It is agreed that such training programs must not exceed a total duration of two weeks but there are allegations every year that some countries exceed this limit by months or even years. Another concern is that some countries tend to bring the same students to the competition year after year, which helps them win better medals. Although some believe that this is against the spirit of the olympiad, many nations find it hard to justify leaving their best students at home.

== History ==
The idea of the International Chemistry Olympiad was developed in the former Czechoslovakia in 1968. It was designed with the aim to increase the number of international contacts and the exchange of information between nations. Invitations were sent by the Czechoslovak national committee to all Warsaw Pact countries, except Romania (due to political issues between Romania and USSR). However, in May 1968, relations between Czechoslovakia and the Soviet Union became so delicate that only Poland and Hungary participated in the first international competition.

The first International Chemistry Olympiad took place in Prague between 18 and 21 June 1968. Each of the three participating countries sent a team of six students, and four theoretical tasks were to be solved. Guidelines for the next competitions were already suggested. The second chemistry Olympiad took place in 1969 in Poland, and Bulgaria also participated, with USSR and GDR only sending observers. Each team consisted of five pupils, and an experimental competition was added. The decision was made to invite more socialist countries to future competitions and to limit the number of pupils to four. The third Olympiad in 1970 was organized in Hungary with the GDR, Romania and the Soviet Union as new countries. In this competition, more than three prizes were distributed for the first time.

There was no Olympiad held in 1971, as at the end of the competition in 1970, an organizer and host for the next event could not be agreed on. This was solved for the next three years by diplomatically agreeing on the Soviet Union to host 1972, Bulgaria in 1973, and Romania in 1974, starting the tradition to decide the host years in advance. 1972 was the first time where preparation tasks for the International Chemistry Olympiad were created. Also, at a jury session, it was suggested that invitations should be sent to Vietnam, Mongolia, and Cuba. However, these invitations were not sent, leaving seven to compete in 1973.

In 1974, Romania invited Sweden and Yugoslavia to the Olympiad in Bucharest, while Germany and Austria sent observers. The Federal Republic of Germany was the first NATO-country with an observer present and this was only able to occur because the Brandt government had contracts in the East. Thus, in 1975, West Germany, Austria, and Belgium also participated in the International Chemistry Olympiad.

The first Olympiad in a non-socialist country took place 1980 in Linz in Austria, although the Soviet Union did not participate. Since then the number of the participating countries has increased steadily. In 1980, only 13 nations took part but this number increased to 21 by the 1984 Olympiad in Frankfurt/Main. With the fall of the Iron Curtain and the break-up of the Soviet Union into independent states in the early 1990s, the number of participants increased again. In addition, the increasing interest of Asian and Latin American countries became apparent with the numbers of participants. Altogether 47 delegations participated in 1998. Presently, 88 countries are invited to the International Chemistry Olympiads.

== Summary ==
No.	Year	City	Country	Absolute winner	Date	Website	Teams	New teams
1	1968	Prague	Czechoslovakia	(Hungary) Fuggerth Endre	June 18–21		3	Czechoslovakia, Poland, Hungary
2	1969	Katowice	Poland	(Poland) Barbara Gałęziowska (Poland) Jolanta Słomińska	June 16–20		4	Bulgaria
3	1970	Budapest	Hungary	(Hungary) László Lex	July 1–5		7	GDR, Romania, Soviet Union
—	1971	not held						
4	1972	Moscow	Soviet Union	(Soviet Union) Vjacheslav Zagorskiy	July 1–10		7	—
5	1973	Sofia	Bulgaria	(Poland) Maciej Gonet	July 1–10		7	—
6	1974	Bucharest	Romania	(Soviet Union) Victor Sokolov	July 1–10		9	Sweden, Yugoslavia
7	1975	Veszprém	Hungary	(Soviet Union) Jurij Razhkazovskij	July 1–10		12	Austria, FRG, Belgium
8	1976	Halle	East Germany	(Hungary) Tamás Jankó	July 10–19		12	—
9	1977	Bratislava	Czechoslovakia	(Austria) Wolf Dieter Aichberger	July 4–14		12	(observers from UNESCO)
10	1978	Toruń	Poland	(Soviet Union) Andrej Vedernikov	July 3–13		12	—
11	1979	Leningrad	Soviet Union	(Austria) Wolfgang Schwabl	July 2–11		11	—
12	1980	Linz	Austria	(Poland) Jerzy Kosiński	July 13–23		13	Netherlands, Italy
13	1981	Burgas	Bulgaria	(Czech Republic) Tomáš Kovár	July 13–23		14	France
14	1982	Stockholm	Sweden	(Germany) Manfred Lehn	July 3–12		17	Yugoslavia, Denmark, Norway
15	1983	Timișoara	Romania	(Germany) Thomas Endres	July 2–11		18	United Kingdom
16	1984	Frankfurt	West Germany	(Germany) Jürgen Schleucher	July 1–10		21	Greece, Kuwait, USA
17	1985	Bratislava	Czechoslovakia	(Soviet Union) Aleksej Jermakov	July 1–8		22	Cuba
18	1986	Leiden	Netherlands	(Netherlands) Alain Verberkmoes	July 6–15		23	Canada
19	1987	Veszprém	Hungary	(Germany) Jörg Woehl	July 6–15		26	Switzerland, China
20	1988	Espoo	Finland	(China) Chen Wang	July 2–9		26	Australia, Singapore
21	1989	Halle	East Germany	(Bulgaria) Tomislav Gunchev	July 2–10		26	—
22	1990	Paris	France	(China) Jie Wu	July 8–17		28	Cyprus, Thailand
23	1991	Łódź	Poland	(China) Cheng Lin	July 7–15		30	Latvia, Lithuania, Slovenia
24	1992	Pittsburgh and Washington, D.C.	United States	(China) Ye Zheng	July 11–22		33	New Zealand, Mexico
25	1993	Perugia	Italy	(Germany) Jens Graeber	July 11–22		38	Iran, Slovakia, Czech Republic, Venezuela, Taiwan, Korea
26	1994	Oslo	Norway	(Russia) Dmitry Bondar	July 3–11		39	Estonia, Turkey, Ukraine
27	1995	Beijing	China	(Iran) Roozbeh Kiani	July 13–20		42	
28	1996	Moscow	Russia	(China) Xiaoping Zhou	July 14–23		45	Belarus
29	1997	Montreal	Canada	(Turkey) Salih Ozcubukcu	July 13–22		47	
30	1998	Melbourne	Australia	(China) Mingzhao Liu	July 5–14		47	
31	1999	Bangkok	Thailand	(United States) Timothy Jones	July 4–11		52	India
32	2000	Copenhagen	Denmark	(United States) David Kurtz	July 2–11		53	
33	2001	Mumbai	India	(China) Siyuan Chen	July 6–15		54	
34	2002	Groningen	Netherlands	(China) Ye Zhu	July 5–14		57	
35	2003	Athens	Greece	(Belgium) Aleksei Putau	July 5–14		60	
36	2004	Kiel	Germany	(Russia) Alexey Zelfman	July 18–27		61	
37	2005	Taipei	Taiwan	(Russia) Alexey Zeifman	July 16–25		59	
38	2006	Gyeongsan	South Korea	(South Korea) Hwan Bae	July 1–11		66	Saudi Arabia, Israel
39	2007	Moscow	Russia	(China) Lei Xu	July 15–24		68	
40	2008	Budapest	Hungary	(China) Yongping Fu	July 12–21			
41	2009	Cambridge	United Kingdom	(China) Ruibo Wang	July 18–27			
42	2010	Tokyo	Japan	(China) Xianghang Shangguan	July 19–28			
43	2011	Ankara	Turkey	(China) Zongping Gong	July 9–18			
44	2012	Washington, D.C.	United States	(Germany) Florian Berger	July 21–30			
45	2013	Moscow	Russia	(China) Yuyang Dong	July 15–24		74	
46	2014	Hanoi	Vietnam	(Singapore) Sun Jiarui	July 20–29			
47	2015	Baku	Azerbaijan	(China) Yifu Ouyang	July 20–29			
48	2016	Tbilisi	Georgia	(Romania) Andrei Iliescu	July 23 – August 1			
49	2017	Nakhon Pathom	Thailand	(Russia) Alexander Zhigalin	July 6–15		76	
50	2018	Bratislava; Prague	Slovakia; Czech Republic	(China) Qingyu Chen	July 19–29		76	
51	2019	Paris	France	(China) Liu He	July 21–30		80	
52	2020	Istanbul (online)	Turkey	(United States) Alex Zihan Li	July 23–30		60	
53	2021	Osaka (online)	Japan	(China) Shu Yang	July 24 – August 2		79	
54	2022	Tianjin (online)	China	(China) Zhou Fu	July 10–18		84	
55	2023	Zürich	Switzerland	(China) Weijie Mao	July 16–25		89	
56	2024	Riyadh	Saudi Arabia	(China) Zhong Zheng	July 21–30		84	
57	2025	Dubai	United Arab Emirates	(China) Zilu Song	July 5–14			
58	2026	Tashkent	Uzbekistan	Arsenil Gasanenko (Note: Gasanenko is Russian, but he competes as a neutral competitor as Russia was banned following the Russian invasion of Ukraine. He competed under the team "individual 2.")	July 10–19		84	
59	2027		Taiwan		July 19-28			
60	2028	Messina	Italy		July 2-11			
61	2029		Brazil (most likely)					

=== Remote IChO ===
Due to the COVID-19 pandemic, IChO 2020, 2021 and 2022 were organized remotely without a laboratory exam in order to keep the Olympic spirit of collaboration and peace even in harsh times.

== Distribution of medals ==
The current list of countries with the best results for last decade by Golds are as follows as of July 2026 (Consolidated from following sources:):

Rank	Country	Gold in Last 11 contests (2016-2026)
1	China	41 (4+3+4+3+3+4+4+4+4+4+4)
2	Vietnam	33 (2+3+1+2+4+3+4+3+3+4+4)
3	USA	31 (1+4+4+3+4+2+1+2+3+4+3)
4	Taiwan	30 (3+4+1+2+2+3+4+3+2+3+3)
5	Singapore	24 (2+2+2+2+3+2+2+4+1+1+3)
6	South Korea	22 (3+2+3+4+2+1+2+1+1+1+2)
7	India	17 (2+1+2+2+x+2+0+1+1+2+4)
8	Russia	16 (3+2+2+4+1+4+x+x+x+x+x) (Note: Students from Russia and Belarus have competed as individuals since 2022)
9	Iran	15 (2+3+0+1+1+2+2+3+1+0+0)
10	Japan	14 (1+1+1+2+0+0+4+2+2+1)
10	Romania	14 (3+2+0+1+x+3+2+1+0+1+1)
12	Czech Republic	10 (0+0+3+1+1+1+1+0+1+1+1)
12	United Kingdom	10 (0+0+3+1+1+2+0+1+0+1+1)
14	Bulgaria	9 (0+1+1+1+0+0+1+2+1+1+1)
15	Thailand	8 (2+2+1+1+0+0+0+1+0+1)
15	Turkey	8 (x+1+1+0+2+2+1+1+0+0+0)
15	Kazakhstan	8 (0+1+0+0+0+0+1+1+2+2+1)
18	Uzbekistan	7 (0+0+0+0+0+1+0+2+1+2+1)
18	Israel	7 (0+0+0+0+1+1+1+0+x+2+2)
20	Poland	6 (1+0+0+0+0+0+1+1+2+1+0)
21	Ukraine	5 (0+0+1+1+x+0+0+0+0+2+1)
22	Brazil	3(0+0+2+0+0+0+0+0+1+0+0)
22	Slovakia	3 (0+0+0+2+0+0+0+0+1+0+0)
22	Germany	3 (0+0+0+0+0+0+0+1+0+1+1)
22	Hungary	3 (0+0+1+0+0+0+0+1+0+0+1)
26	Denmark	2 (0+0+0+1+0+0+0+0+0+1+0)
26	Indonesia	2 (0+1+1+0+0+0+0+0+0+0+0)
26	Lithuania	2 (0+1+0+0+0+0+0+0+1+0+0)
26	Australia	2 (0+0+0+0+1+0+0+0+0+0+1)
26	Canada	2 (x+0+0+0+0+0+0+0+1+0+1)
31	Belarus	1 (1+0+0+0+x+0+x+x+x+x) (Note: Students from Russia and Belarus have competed as individuals since 2022)
31	Argentina	1 (0+0+0+1+x+x+0+0+0+0+0)
31	Austria	1 (x+0+0+0+0+0+0+0+1+0+0)
31	Azerbaijan	1 (0+1+0+0+0+0+0+0+0+0+0)
31	Armenia	1 (0+0+0+0+0+0+0+1+0+0+0)
31	France	1 (0+0+1+0+0+0+0+0+0+0+0)
31	Italy	1 (0+0+0+1+x+x+x+0+0+0+0)
31	Latvia	1 (0+0+0+1+0+0+0+0+0+0+0)
31	Peru	1 (0+1+0+0+x+x+0+0+0+0+0)
31	Serbia	1 (0+0+0+0+0+0+0+0+1+0+0)
31	Turkmenistan	1 (0+0+0+0+x+0+1+0+0+0)
31	Moldova	1 (0+0+0+0+0+0+0+0+0+0+1)

0 denotes participated and yet did not get any gold, whilst x denotes the country did not participate at that year

Presently, the top 10-12% of scorers receive gold medals, the next 20-22% receive silver medals, and the next 30-32% receive bronze medals. The next ~10% receive honourable mentions.

== See also ==
- Asian Physics Olympiad
- International Physics Olympiad
- International Astronomy Olympiad
- International Biology Olympiad
- List of chemistry awards
- Tuymaada
