= Eric Maskin =

American Nobel laureate in economics

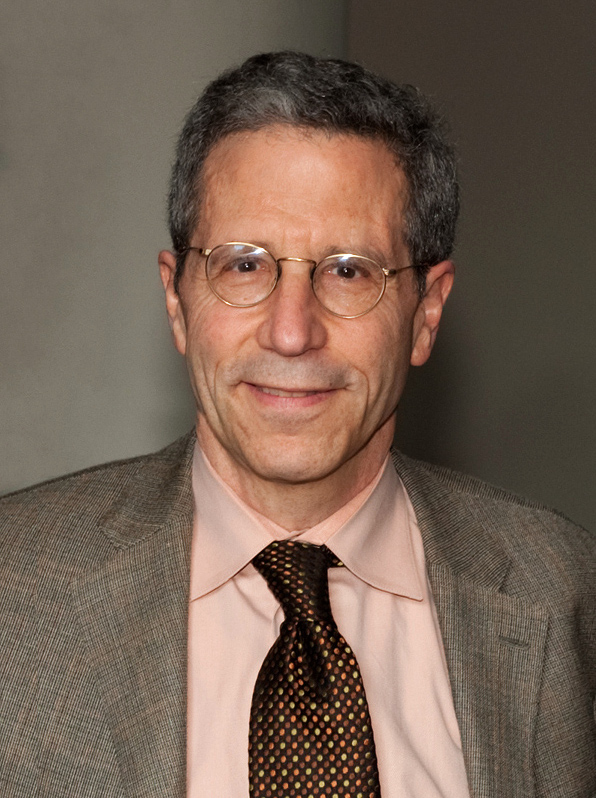
- Maskin in 2009
- Born: December 12, 1950 (age 75); New York City, U.S.

Academic background
- Education: Harvard University (BA, MA, PhD)
- Thesis: Social choice on restricted domains (1976)
- Doctoral advisor: Kenneth Arrow

Academic work
- Discipline: Game theory
- Institutions: Harvard University; Institute for Advanced Study; Massachusetts Institute of Technology; Princeton University; University of Cambridge
- Doctoral students: See list: Abhijit Banerjee; Michael Kremer; Robert W. Vishny
- Notable ideas: Mechanism design
- Awards: Nobel Memorial Prize (2007)
- Website: Information at IDEAS / RePEc

Eric Stark Maskin (born December 12, 1950) is an American economist and mathematician. He was jointly awarded the 2007 Nobel Memorial Prize in Economic Sciences with Leonid Hurwicz and Roger Myerson "for having laid the foundations of mechanism design theory". He is the Adams University Professor and Professor of Economics and Mathematics at Harvard University.

Until 2011, he was the Albert O. Hirschman Professor of Social Science at the Institute for Advanced Study, and a visiting lecturer with the rank of professor at Princeton University.

== Early life and education ==
Maskin was born in New York City on December 12, 1950, into a Jewish family, and spent his youth in Alpine, New Jersey. He graduated from Tenafly High School in Tenafly, New Jersey, in 1968. In 1972, he graduated with A.B. in mathematics from Harvard College. In 1974, he earned A.M. in applied mathematics and in 1976 earned a Ph.D. in applied mathematics, both at Harvard University. In 1975–76, he was a visiting student at Darwin College, Cambridge University.

== Career and topics ==
In 1976, after earning his doctorate, Maskin became a research fellow at Jesus College, Cambridge University. In the following year, he joined the faculty at Massachusetts Institute of Technology. In 1985 he returned to Harvard as the Louis Berkman Professor of Economics, where he remained until 2000. In 1987, he was a visiting fellow at St John's College, Cambridge. During the 1990s he advised the Bank of Italy on the operation of its bond auctions. In 2000, he moved to the Institute for Advanced Study in Princeton, New Jersey. In addition to his position at the Princeton Institute, Maskin is the director of the Jerusalem Summer School in Economic Theory at The Institute for Advanced Studies at The Hebrew University of Jerusalem. In 2010, he was conferred an honorary doctoral degree in economics from The University of Cambodia. In 2011, Maskin returned to Harvard as the Adams University Professor and professor of economics and mathematics.

Maskin has worked in diverse areas of economic theory, such as game theory, the economics of incentives, and contract theory. He is particularly known for his papers on mechanism design/implementation theory and dynamic games. With Jean Tirole, he advanced the concept of Markov perfect equilibrium. His research projects include comparing different electoral rules, examining the causes of inequality, and studying coalition formation.

Maskin is a Fellow of the American Academy of Arts and Sciences, Econometric Society, and the European Economic Association, and a Corresponding Fellow of the British Academy. He was president of the Econometric Society in 2003.

In 2014, Maskin was appointed as a visiting professor at Covenant University, Nigeria.

In September 2017, Maskin received the title of HEC Paris Honoris Causa Professor. He also served on the Social Sciences jury for the Infosys Prize in 2018.

Furthermore, he is the chairman of the advisory board of the International Economics Olympiad. In June 2026 he became the president of the International Economic Association succeeding Elhanan Helpman in the role.

== Political views ==
Along with Ned Foley, Maskin has proposed the use of Baldwin's voting method, under the name "Total Vote Runoff", as a way to fix problems with the instant-runoff method ("Ranked Choice Voting") in U.S. jurisdictions that use it, ensuring majority support of the winner and electing more broadly-acceptable candidates.

In June 2024, 16 Nobel Prize in Economics laureates, including Maskin, signed an open letter arguing that Donald Trump’s fiscal and trade policies coupled with efforts to limit the Federal Reserve's independence would reignite inflation in the United States.

== Software patents ==
Maskin suggested that software patents inhibit innovation rather than stimulate progress. Software, semiconductor, and computer industries have been innovative despite historically weak patent protection, he argued. Innovation in those industries has been sequential and complementary, so competition can increase firms' future profits. In such a dynamic industry, "patent protection may reduce overall innovation and social welfare". A natural experiment occurred in the 1980s when patent protection was extended to software", wrote Maskin with co-author James Bessen. "Standard arguments would predict that R&D intensity and productivity should have increased among patenting firms. Consistent with our model, however, these increases did not occur". Other evidence supporting this model includes a distinctive pattern of cross-licensing and a positive relationship between rates of innovation and firm entry.

== See also ==
- List of economists
- Mechanism design
- List of Jewish Nobel laureates

Awards
Preceded by Edmund S. Phelps	Laureate of the Nobel Memorial Prize in Economics; 2007; Served alongside: Leonid Hurwicz, Roger B. Myerson	Succeeded by Paul Krugman
