= Tuymaada =

Annual competition for students in Russia

The International Olympiad "Tuymaada" is an annual competition for students under the age of 18, held in the Sakha Republic, Russia. The contestants compete individually, in four independent sections: computer science, mathematics, physics and chemistry. The participating teams (national and local teams) can have up to three students for one section (the total number of students that can participate for a team being twelve, plus two teachers: a leader and a deputy leader). The contest is held in July, for two days of competitions. The structure is being in conformity with the International Science Olympiads worldwide and all Russian National Science Olympiads.

== History of the Olympiad ==
In 1993, the Ministry of Education decided to open a summer school where pupils who showed good results on various maths, physics and computing Olympiads were invited to. The leading teachers of the republic taught classes and there was a summer Olympiad held. That year, the team of the Buryatia republic was also invited. In 1994, it was decided to hold the first international Olympiad of schoolchildren. The summer school for gifted children was later named the International Summer School "Tuymaada" as part of the presidential program "Gifted Children". Pavlova E.N., head of the department of the Ministry of Education, has been in charge of the Olympiad and a principal of the school for all these years.

== The organizers ==
The Chairmen of 2007 edition

The organizers of the Olympiads and the initiators of foundation of specialized classes in the Republic were such professors, as M.A. Alekseev, S.G. Dyrachov, V.N. Sophroneev, I.E. Serguchev, I.M. Yakoylev and others. Staff of the Verchneviluysk physics and mathematics school also contributed to the programme: V. Dolgunov, N. Ivanov, A. Semenov, A. Machasynov. Other teachers involved included M. Shergin, O. Sukneva, V. Ratchin, G. Isaev, P. Timopheev, J. Nogovichyna, L. Semenov, R. Mustakimov, T. Demidko, E. Kozlova, M. Sleptsova, Z. Chetvertakova, S. Egorova, and others. The physics and mathematics school (now known as the Republican college), founded in 1977, also contributed. With the support of Aliev I., first principal, candidate of sciences, senior lecturer at Yakut State University, the school became a notable institution for gifted children. Other contributors included A.M. Abramov, Doctor of Sciences, member-journalist of the Russian Academy of Education, Moscow; T.T. Timopheev, candidate of sciences, Novosibirsk; I.F. Sharygin, doctor of sciences, professor of Moscow State University; D.G. Von-Der Flaas, candidate of sciences, member of the all-Russian Olympiads jury and many other Russian scientists and professors.

== Early developments ==
Nowadays the Olympiads are held on various subjects, the special attention is paid to the use of new informational technologies. The coordination of distant intellectual studies is carried out by Popov S.V., professor of Yakut State University, doctor of sciences and by Potapov V.F., the honoured teacher of the Russian Federation. The level of tasks is intended to meet the standards of All-Russian and International Olympiads.

The participants of 2007 edition

== See also ==
- International Science Olympiad
- ACM International Collegiate Programming Contest
- Central European Olympiad in Informatics
