= James Bessen =

American economist

- Born: 1950 (age 74–75)
- Occupation(s): Executive Director of the Technology & Policy Research Initiative, Lecturer
- Employer: Boston University School of Law

James Bessen (born 1950) is an economist who has been a lecturer at Boston University School of Law since 2004. He is presently best known for his data-led research concerning software and innovation. He has also demonstrated the diverse impacts of automation on employment and wages. In more recent work, he has established links between investment in software and market dominance in a number of sectors. Before entering academia professionally, Bessen was previously a software developer and CEO of Bestinfo, a software company. Bessen was also a Fellow at the Berkman Center for Internet and Society.

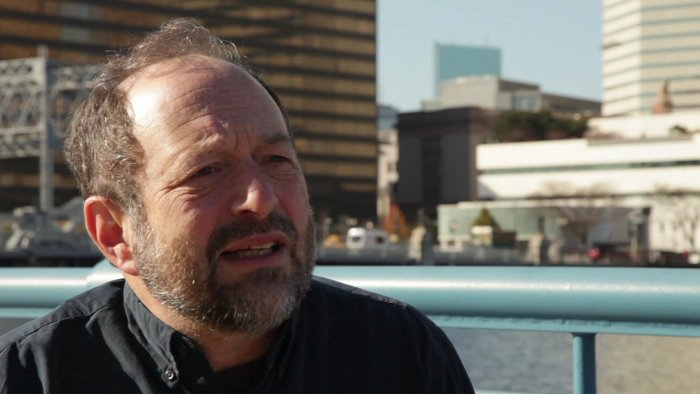
Bessen in 2010

Bessen researches the economics of innovation, including patents and economic history. He has written about software patents with Eric Maskin, arguing that they might inhibit innovation rather than stimulate progress. With Michael J. Meurer, he wrote Patent Failure: How Judges, Bureaucrats, and Lawyers Put Innovators at Risk as well as papers on patent trolls. His book Learning by Doing: The Real Connection Between Innovation, Wages, and Wealth argues that major new technologies require new skills and knowledge that are slow and difficult to develop, affecting jobs and wages.

Bessen developed the first WYSIWYG desktop publishing program at a community newspaper in Philadelphia in 1983. He established and ran a company, Bestinfo, to sell that program commercially. In 1993, Bestinfo was sold to Intergraph.

He graduated from Harvard University in 1972.
