= International Olympiad in Artificial Intelligence =

Artificial intelligence competition

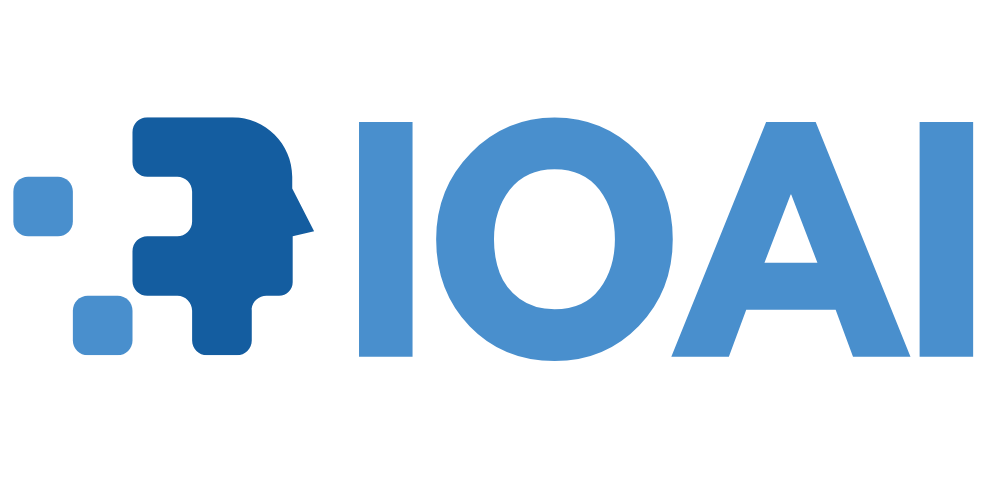
The official logo of the IOAI

The International Olympiad in Artificial Intelligence (IOAI) is an annual International Science Olympiad in the field of artificial intelligence (AI) for secondary education students under the age of 20. The first IOAI was held in Burgas, Bulgaria, in 2024.

The competition includes an Individual Contest covering areas such as machine learning, NLP and computer vision, as well as separate Team Challenge.

Each country or territory may send up to two teams, each consisting of up to four students supported by one leader. Participants are selected through a multi-stage National Olympiad in Artificial Intelligence (NOAI) and/or a Regional Olympiad such as the NAOAI or APOAI. Participants at the IOAI compete on an individual basis.

The Olympiad has expanded substantially since its first edition. Nearly 200 students participated in the inaugural competition in 2024, followed by more than 300 participants in Beijing in 2025.

The third edition, held in Astana, Kazakhstan, from 2 to 8 August 2026, brought together 466 contestants representing 108 countries and territories and was described as the largest edition of the Olympiad to date.

The fourth edition is scheduled to be held in Singapore in 2027.

== History ==
=== 2024 - Burgas ===
The inaugural IOAI was held in Burgas, Bulgaria, from 9 to 15 August 2024. Nearly 200 students from dozens of countries participated in the first edition.

The event established the Olympiad as an international competition focused specifically on artificial intelligence for secondary-school students. The event featured nearly 200 students from 32 countries and territories from 6 continents, organized into 41 teams. In the Team Challenge, the students worked in the space of AI and art, creating a single cover and video for the remix of the song "Love" by Bulgarian singer Maria Ilieva.

=== 2025 - Beijing ===
The second IOAI was held in Beijing, China, in August 2025. The competition expanded substantially from its inaugural edition, with more than 300 students representing over 60 countries and territories.

=== 2026 - Astana ===
The third IOAI was held in Astana, Kazakhstan, from 2 to 8 August 2026. At the opening, media reports described more than 500 students from 106 countries as attending the event. Final participation figures listed 466 contestants representing 108 countries and territories. The 2026 competition was the largest edition in the Olympiad's three-year history.

The Olympiad was held under the patronage of UNESCO. President of Kazakhstan Kassym-Jomart Tokayev attended the opening ceremony, where he spoke about artificial intelligence and Kazakhstan's digital-development strategy.

The competition included two individual contest rounds covering areas such as machine learning, computer vision and natural language processing, as well as a separate Team Challenge.

Artem Gorokhov of Russia placed first in the individual competition, followed by Dauzhan Beketov of Kazakhstan and Shao Zixi of China.

Kazakhstan became the first Central Asian country to host the IOAI.

=== 2027 – Singapore ===
Singapore is scheduled to host the fourth IOAI in 2027. Singapore's Ministry of Education announced in 2025 that the country had been selected as host of the fourth edition.

The 2027 Olympiad is expected to be jointly hosted by Nanyang Technological University and AI Singapore.

== Editions ==
Edition	Year	Host city	Host country	Participation
1st	2024	Burgas	Bulgaria	41 teams from 32 countries and territories
2nd	2025	Beijing	China	310 students from 63 countries and territories
3rd	2026	Astana	Kazakhstan	466 students from 108 countries and territories
4th	2027	Singapore	Singapore	Scheduled

== Competition structure ==
The IOAI consists of three contests: the Individual Contest, the Team Challenge, and the GAITE contest. Medals are awarded based solely on the Individual Contest.

=== Individual Contest ===
The Individual Contest is the main competition of the IOAI in which contestants compete individually on separate computers and are not permitted to communicate during the contest. Medals are awarded solely on the basis of the total score from the two-day Individual Contest. The Individual Contest consists of two on-site contest days (six hours per day), preceded by an at-home practice round and an on-site practice session. In IOAI 2025, three at-home problems were released for preparation approximately one month before the on-site contest. Results from this at-home round do not affect final results.

The first on-site contest day (Individual Contest 1) comprises three tasks as extensions and continuations of the at-home tasks, while the second day (Individual Contest 2) comprises two or three tasks which are novel and different from the at-home tasks. The Individual Contest tasks span various AI domains such as machine learning, natural language processing, and computer vision.

The IOAI 2025 contest rules describe tasks as requiring typical machine-learning workflows, including writing code, fitting models on training data, and running inference on test data, using identical local machines and GPU resources (minimum 24 GB RAM). Tasks, datasets, and submissions are handled through a contest platform (Bohrium), including a web-based Jupyter notebook environment for GPU access. Internet access is restricted to a whitelist of documentation sites and an integrated compact large language model accessible within the platform. The use of external APIs is prohibited unless a task explicitly allows them.

In IOAI 2025, each contest task was scored up to 100 points and could include multiple subtasks. Scores are normalized using a baseline solution and a maximum score derived from either a Scientific Committee solution or the best contestant submission. Contestants can view only their own scores during the contest; a live scoreboard may be available publicly outside the contest hall but is not permitted to be viewed by contestants during the contest.

For non-English-speaking teams, the IOAI holds a translation session beginning three hours before each contest day, during which team leaders review and may amend machine-translated task statements. Translations must match the English original and are published after the contest. During these sessions, quarantine rules prohibit contestants and team leaders from using phones, laptops, or other communication devices.

=== Team Challenge ===
The Team Challenge is a collaborative component of the IOAI in which contestants compete as teams rather than individually. Its results do not affect the distribution of individual medals, and the format varies between editions. In 2024, teams used AI image- and video-generation tools to produce a visual interpretation of a music track. In 2025, the challenge involved programming robots to perform assigned tasks.

=== GAITE Contest ===
The GAITE (Global AI Talent Empowerment) contest is a simplified version of the individual contest with a separate scoreboard, where participants may ask for hints. It is designed for countries and territories with limited International Science Olympiads history, and it awards alternative prizes instead of medals.

== Awards distribution ==
The top 50% of the participants in the individual contest receive gold, silver and bronze medals in ratio of 1:2:3, respectively. The top three individuals receive honorary trophies. As in other International Science Olympiads, if an individual is in the top 50% on one of the days, but does not receive a medal, they receive an honorary mention during the awards ceremony. The GAITE contest has similar cutoff logic, but receives a reward instead of a medal. The top three teams in the Team Challenge receive trophies.

== National selection and regional competitions ==
National delegations are selected through country-level qualification processes referred to as National Olympiads in Artificial Intelligence (NOAI) or equivalent.

In addition, regional Olympiads (for example, APOAI or NAOAI) provide continent-level competition and preparation platforms in most regions.

=== National selection (National Olympiads in Artificial Intelligence) ===
Participating countries and territories select their students for the IOAI through a National Olympiad in Artificial Intelligence (NOAI) or an equivalent process. Selection formats vary by country and may include multiple competition, training, and team-selection stages. In 2026, the national qualifiers drew as many as 965,000 entrants in a single country.

- United States / Canada – The USA–North America AI Olympiad (USAAIO) is a three-round process including an invitational in-person round and a subsequent selection camp, after which a national delegation is selected for IOAI.
- Russia – The Russian Olympiad in Artificial Intelligence is organized as a multi-stage process (training, qualification, main round, final). Organizers reported 72,316 registrations for the training round and 52,260 registrations for the qualifying round in one season, with tasks spanning mathematics, algorithms/programming, and machine learning; 977 students were disqualified following plagiarism checks.
- Japan – Japan's national selection consists of multiple stages, beginning with the Japan Olympiad in Artificial Intelligence (JOAI), a 10-day-long data science competition. The top 10% of participants advance through further rounds, including written solution reports and 30-minute individual technical interviews. From this process, eight students are selected for the APOAI team, with four ultimately chosen for the IOAI. Japan is the only country that conducts mandatory selection at both national (three-stage) and regional (Asia-Pacific) levels.
- Brazil – Brazil's National Olympiad in Artificial Intelligence (ONIA) is conducted as a large-scale competition which consists of progressive rounds of evaluation. It identifies 28 top students, four of which are selected for the IOAI. The competition is held in four phases across two cycles, including a two-step third phase and a final training-and-evaluation phase that selects a four-student national team.
- Singapore – Singapore's national Olympiad consists of two rounds: an online preliminary round (300 MCQs in 3 hours) selects the top 150 performers to advance to the final assessment, which includes both theory questions and Python programming tasks. Additional training and selection may follow the finals for top performers.
- Poland – The Polish AI Olympiad consists of three stages. The first round is an online contest open to every high school student in Poland, after which the best participants qualify for the second round hosted in four cities: Kraków, Poznań, Wrocław, and Warsaw. Finally, the highest-scoring contestants advance to the national finals where the national team is selected.
- France – The Olympiades Françaises d'Intelligence Artificielle (OFIA), organized by France-IOI, follow a three-stage structure consisting of an open online qualification round, a second selection round, and a multi-day national training camp and final in Paris.
- Bangladesh – The Bangladesh AI Olympiad (BdAIO) selects competitors in three rounds: the online preliminary round, the national finals, and the team selection camp. In 2025, 406 participants competed in the national finals.
- Norway – The Norwegian AI Olympiad (NOKI) has a three-stage selection system; however, unlike other countries, its first two rounds are shared with the Norwegian Informatics Olympiad. The national Olympiad reports 1,180 participants in the first round.
- Hong Kong – The national Olympiad reported more than 800 preliminary-round entrants, narrowing through multiple rounds to 25 finalists, with a subsequent training qualification step (12 students) and a final delegation selection step (top 8).
- Australia – The national Olympiad includes multiple rounds (including an online academic round and an advanced technical assessment), followed by a final round aligned with APOAI standards for national team selection.
- India – The India AI Olympiad (INAIO) hosted by AMC India is a four-stage selection program.
- Ukraine – The national Olympiad is a four-stage selection process beginning with an online academic round, followed by later stages focused on data analysis and machine learning principles, practical model-building tasks, and a final training-and-selection stage for the national team.
- China – China's National Olympiad in Artificial Intelligence culminates in a national finals competition with over 160 finalists competing in a synchronized contest, from which eight students are selected.
- Chinese Taipei – The Taiwan Olympiad in Artificial Intelligence (TOAI) serves as the national selection competition. The selection process identifies 16 top-performing students from the preliminary round to advance to the final evaluation stage. From these finalists, eight students are ultimately chosen to form the national delegation to compete at the IOAI.

=== Regional Olympiads in Artificial Intelligence ===
Regional Olympiads in Artificial Intelligence are competitions held under the supervision of the IOAI. They are intended to support national Olympiads, provide additional competition and training opportunities, and develop regional AI Olympiad communities.

The regional Olympiad structure for the 2026–2027 cycle includes:

- African Olympiad in Artificial Intelligence (AOAI) – Hosted in Sousse, Tunisia (9–12 April 2026) in a hybrid format with online participants.
- Asia Pacific Olympiad in Artificial Intelligence (APOAI) – Hosted in China (13–20 June 2026) in a hybrid format, with participants from 18 countries. Contestants solved four problems over a total of six hours. Japan used the competition as an additional selection stage for its IOAI delegation, selecting four students from its eight-member APOAI team.
- European Olympiad in Artificial Intelligence (EOAI) – to be formed (2027)
- Americas Olympiad in Artificial Intelligence (AMOAI) – to be formed (2027)

At least one subregional Olympiad exists:

- North American Olympiad in Artificial Intelligence (NAOAI), also known as the USA–North America AI Olympiad (USA-NA-AIO), is organized by the USA Artificial Intelligence Olympiad (USAAIO) for K–12 students in the United States and Canada. It serves as the qualification pathway for selecting Team USA for international AI Olympiads, including the IOAI. The competition follows a three-stage selection process consisting of an open Round 1, an in-person Round 2, and the USAAIO training and team-selection camp. In 2026, the Round 2 competition was held on 4–5 April at Harvard University and MIT. Nearly 200 students advanced from Round 1 to this stage. Top-performing students from Round 2 subsequently advanced to the USAAIO camp at Harvard in June, where Team USA was selected.

== Founding and partnerships ==
The IOAI was founded by the LERAI Foundation, with members Lora Dineva, Elena Marinova, Rositsa Dekova, Aleksandar Velinov, and Iva Gumnishka. The Olympiad has received support from international technology and financial companies and academic institutions. Global partners of the 2026 edition included IMC, Jane Street, Google, Huawei, Galbot, Hudson River Trading (HRT), Mohamed bin Zayed University of Artificial Intelligence (MBZUAI), and DeepInfra.

== Governance ==
The current IOAI board consists of:

- Elena Marinova (Bulgaria) – Chair; IOAI co-founder, eJOI co-founder, Bulgarian Science Olympiads Teams Association.
- Katya Protsko – Secretary; ICPC coach and Head of Olympiad Programs at Central University.
- Ali Sharifi – Chair of the International Scientific Committee (ISC).
- Lora Dineva (Bulgaria) – IOAI co-founder, Union of Bulgarian Mathematicians, Natural Science Olympic Teams Association
- Yong Mao (China) – Representative of the IOAI 2025 host; NOAI Organizing Committee, ITCCC Innovative Education.
- Danabek Kaliazhdarov (Kazakhstan) – Representative of the IOAI 2026 host; Federation for Competitive Programming (CPFED).
- Rositsa Dekova (Bulgaria) – IOAI co-founder; Paisii Hilendarski University of Plovdiv.
- Antonio Carlan (Brazil) – Federal University of Rio Grande do Sul, EduSpace, Brazilian National AI Olympiad.
- Airaj Isaacs (United Arab Emirates) – Mohamed bin Zayed University of Artificial Intelligence (MBZUAI).
- Chenning Lu (Singapore) – Nanyang Technological University and Organizing Committee of Singapore NOAI.

== Participating countries and territories ==
In 2026, 108 countries and territories participated in the 3rd IOAI:

- Albania
- Algeria
- Armenia
- Australia
- Azerbaijan
- Bangladesh
- Belarus
- Benin
- Bolivia
- Bosnia and Herzegovina
- Botswana
- Brazil
- Bulgaria
- Burkina Faso
- Burundi
- (Cape Verde) Cabo Verde
- Cameroon
- Chad
- China
- Colombia
- Comoros
- (Ivory Coast) Côte d'Ivoire
- Cyprus
- Czech Republic
- Denmark
- Ecuador
- Egypt
- El Salvador
- Estonia
- Ethiopia
- France
- (Georgia (country)) Georgia
- Germany
- Ghana
- Greece
- Guinea
- Hong Kong, China
- Hungary
- India
- Indonesia
- Iran
- Isle of Man
- Israel
- Italy
- Jamaica
- Japan
- Jordan
- Kazakhstan
- Kenya
- Kosovo
- Kuwait
- Kyrgyzstan
- Latvia
- Lebanon
- Lesotho
- Macau, China
- Madagascar
- Malaysia
- Mali
- Mexico
- Moldova
- Mongolia
- Montenegro
- Morocco
- Myanmar
- Nepal
- Netherlands
- New Zealand
- Niger
- Nigeria
- Norway
- Pakistan
- Palestine
- Peru
- Philippines
- Poland
- Portugal
- Puerto Rico
- Romania
- Russia
- Rwanda
- Saudi Arabia
- Senegal
- Serbia
- Singapore
- Slovakia
- South Africa
- South Korea
- Spain
- Sri Lanka
- Sudan
- Sweden
- Switzerland
- Syria
- Taiwan (Chinese Taipei)
- Tajikistan
- Thailand
- Togo
- Tunisia
- (Turkey) Türkiye
- United Kingdom
- Ukraine
- United Arab Emirates
- United States of America
- Uzbekistan
- Venezuela
- Vietnam
- Zimbabwe
