= International Junior Science Olympiad =

Annual science competition for students

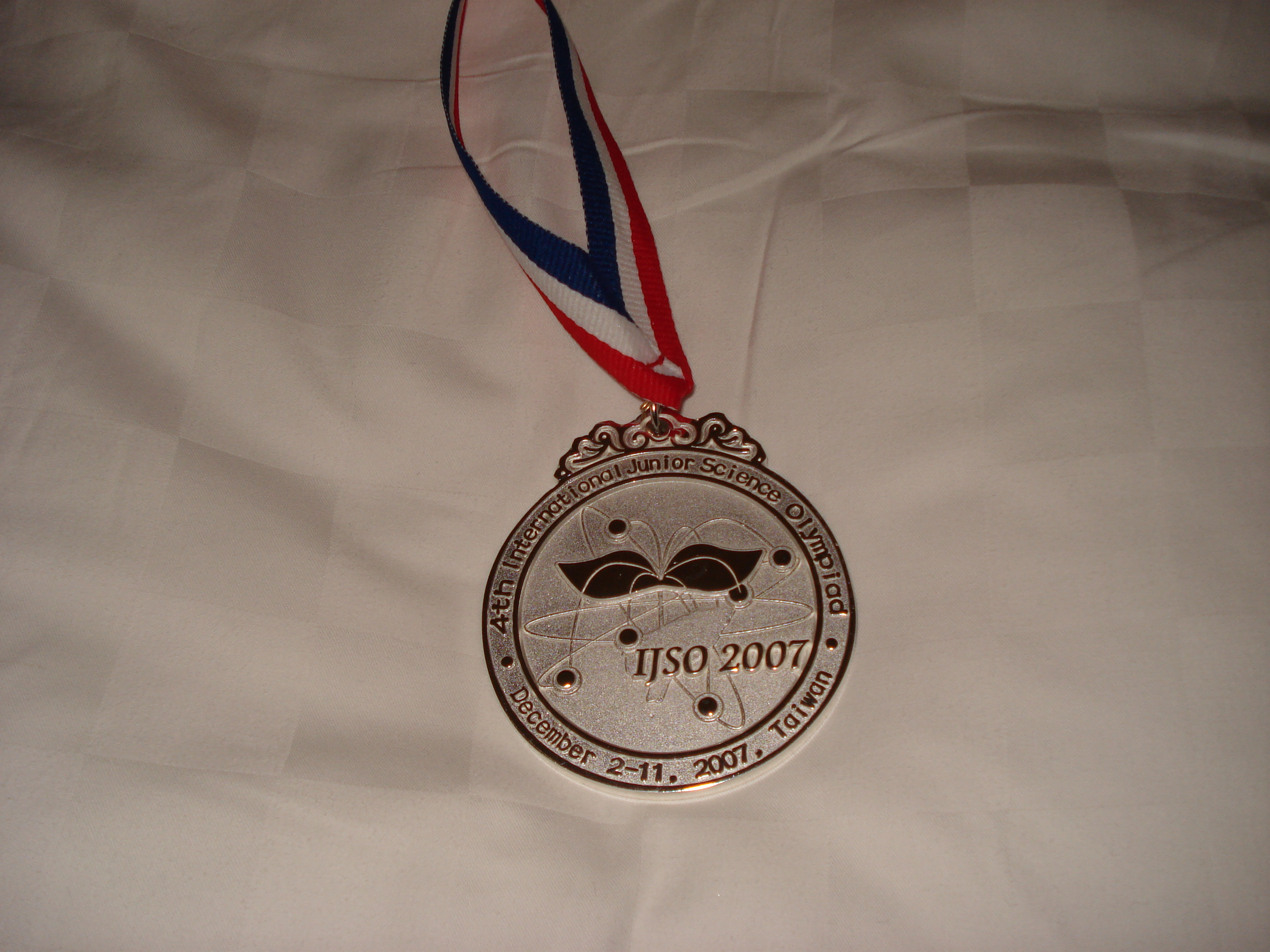
Silver Medal from IJSO 2007 by Tanmay Satyarthi

The International Junior Science Olympiad (IJSO) is an annual science competition for students aged 15 and under. Students are eligible to participate as long as they are less than 16 years old on December 31st of the competition year. It is one of the International Science Olympiads and an international academical competition that covers physics, chemistry and biology at the same time. The first IJSO was held in Jakarta, Indonesia in 2004. Around 50 countries send delegations of three to six students, plus one to three team leaders, and observers. The competition takes place in 3 parts, namely the MCQ round, the Theoretical round, and the Experimental round.

The competition is broken down into three tests, each of which lasts between three and four hours. The theoretical portion consists of two tests: a multiple choice questionnaire consisting of 30 questions, and a theoretical test. The practical portion consists of three laboratory examinations, one for each field.

== Incidents ==
=== 2020 ===
Because of COVID-19, the 17th International Junior Science Olympiad 2020, originally planned to be held in Frankfurt, Germany, was cancelled.

=== 2021 ===
Due to the COVID-19 pandemic, the 18th International Junior Science Olympiad 2021 was conducted in a hybrid format. This allowed students from the participating countries to participate without travelling to the host country United Arab Emirates.

=== 2023 ===
After a poor performance, it was discovered that a Brazilian student had cheated his way through the selection process to get to the IJSO. He was disqualified.

=== 2024 ===
At the closing ceremony of 21st International Junior Science Olympiad 2024, 10 students that should have received a bronze medal, mistakenly received a Silver and 10 students that should have received a Silver, instead were given a Bronze, but due to the only difference being the outline (Outline of a Bronze medal had a "pink bronze" look, and outline of a Silver looked gray-silver colored) no sort of escalation by either side followed at all.

=== 2025 ===
The 2025 competition hosted by Russia, was boycotted due to the ongoing Russia-Ukraine war, and thus only 21 countries participated in comparison to 53 the previous year.

== Executive Committee ==
=== Current members ===
(Netherlands) Emiel De Klejin (President)

(Botswana) Thandie Lekone (Vice President, Africa)

(Colombia) Elena Losada Falk (Vice President, America)

(United Arab Emirates) Abdallah El Marhoune (Vice President, Asia)

(Taiwan) Kwok-Tung Lu (Secretary)

(Indonesia) Budhy Kurniawan (Treasurer)

=== Former Members ===
==== Presidents ====
(India) Paresh K. Joshi (2015–2022)

(South Korea) Sang Chun Lee (2012–2015)

(Indonesia) Masno Ginting (2004–2012)

==== Vice Presidents ====
(South Korea) Ui Wook Hwang (Asia)

(India) Paresh K. Joshi (Asia)

(South Africa) Robin Naidoo (Africa)

(Germany) Heide Peters (Europe)

(Brazil) Ronaldo Fogo (Americas)

(Qatar) Fatima al-Rashid (Asia)

(Republic of Ireland) Paraic James (Europe)

(Lithuania) Paulius L. Tamosiunas (Europe)

==== Relations Officers ====
(Germany) Heide Peters

(Sri Lanka) Mahesh Edirisinghe

Echakart Lucis

==== Secretaries ====
(Taiwan) Yung-Ta Chang

(Zimbabwe) Robin Powles

==== Treasurers ====
(Taiwan) Kwok-Tung Lu

(Republic of Ireland) Paraic James

Michael Cotter

== The Event ==
Upon arrival in the hotel, students are met by their coordinators and led to their rooms. They are also given some gifts. Those include: An IJSO backpack, water bottle and a T-shirt, alongside various different items.

During the event, students and delegates are housed in separate hotels and get to meet each other on three occasions: Opening ceremony, cultural night and closing ceremony. After the opening ceremony ends, any electronics that can connect to Bluetooth are confiscated from students by the delegates (though they still maintain connection through the coordinator, who is in the same hotel with the students). This is done in order to prevent students from knowing the test questions in advance, which are given to delegates one day before the test for them to translate those to their native languages. As a result, students are given two question papers: One in English (Official), and one in their native language.

=== Cultural night ===
Cultural night is on the same day as the experimental test. At cultural night, countries stage a performance related to their culture, mostly either a song or a dance of their choice, but participation is optional, so not many countries perform. In 2024, for example, only 16 out of 53 participating nations had a performance. Also, confiscated electronics are returned to the students on this day.

=== Closing ceremony ===
Closing ceremony involves giving roughly 60% of students a Medal (Gold to 10%, Silver to 20% and Bronze to 30%), but few also get a handful of special awards. Those being: The youngest participant (1 student), best scores in each subject (3 students for each subject), top-scoring group in experiments (3 groups), Top scorer in theoretical portion (MCQ and theory combined), (1 student), Overall (Absolute) winner and Country Winner.

== Summary ==
#	Year	Host country	Host city	Participating Countries	Absolute Winner	Country Winner	Notes
1	2004	Indonesia	Jakarta	31			
2	2005	Indonesia	Yogyakarta	33			
3	2006	Brazil	São Paulo	30	(Taiwan) Nai-Lun Hsu	South Korea	
4	2007	Taiwan	Taipei	36	(Taiwan) Yu’an Chen	Taiwan	
5	2008	South Korea	Changwon	44	(South Korea) Myeonghwan Son	South Korea	
6	2009	Azerbaijan	Baku	46			
7	2010	Nigeria	Abuja	33		Taiwan (3)	
8	2011	South Africa	Durban	41		Taiwan (4)	
9	2012	Iran	Tehran	30	(Taiwan) Lai-He Chang	Taiwan (5)	
10	2013	India	Pune	37	(Taiwan) Chingwei Huang	Taiwan	
11	2014	Argentina	Mendoza	30	(India) Kushagra Juneja	India	
12	2015	South Korea	Daegu	43	(Taiwan) Chenyu Lu	Taiwan	
13	2016	Indonesia	Bali	47		Taiwan	
14	2017	Netherlands	Nijmegen	48	(Russia) Grigorii Bobkov	Taiwan	
15	2018	Botswana	Gaborone	45		Taiwan	
16	2019	Qatar	Doha	67		India	
17	2020	Germany	Frankfurt	(cancelled due to COVID-19)			
18	2021	United Arab Emirates	Dubai (online)	49	(Taiwan) Hsuan-Ming Lin	Taiwan	
19	2022	Colombia	Bogotá	44	(South Korea) Joon Kim	India	
20	2023	Thailand	Bangkok	53	(Taiwan) Tzu-Chiao Yen	Taiwan (12)	
21	2024	Romania	Bucharest	53	(Taiwan) Yi-Yang Fan	India	
22	2025	Russia	Sirius, Krasnodar	21	(Russia) Arseniy Gasanenko	India(Aadish Jain and Anmol Kumar)	
23	2026	Bulgaria	Sofia				
24	2027	TBD					
25	2028	Qatar					
