= International Olympiads =

Set of global competitions of the sciences

The International Olympiads, or International Science Olympiads, are a group of worldwide annual competitions in various areas of the formal sciences, natural sciences, and social sciences. The competitions are usually designed for a team of several best pre-college students from each participating country selected through national competitions. The International Linguistics Olympiad, the International Olympiad on Informatics, and the International Olympiad in Artificial Intelligence allow two teams if certain conditions are met. The International Junior Science Olympiad is designed specifically for junior secondary students and also allows two teams from the hosting country.

Early editions of the first Olympiads were limited to the Eastern Bloc, but later they gradually spread to other countries. They are unrelated to the International Olympic Committee.

International Olympiads are not organized by a single governing body. Competitions listed here are those which have been widely discussed as part of this group in reliable and independent sources.

== Formal and natural sciences ==
#	Science Olympiad	Abbreviation	Years	2026 host country	2027 host country	References
1	International Mathematical Olympiad	IMO	since 1959	China	Hungary	
2	International Physics Olympiad	IPhO	since 1967	Colombia	Saudi Arabia	
3	International Chemistry Olympiad	IChO	since 1968	Uzbekistan	Taiwan	
4	International Olympiad in Informatics	IOI	since 1989	Uzbekistan	Germany	
5	International Biology Olympiad	IBO	since 1990	Lithuania	Poland	
	International Astronomy Olympiad (Note: shrunk in favor of the IOAA and now held online)	IAO	since 1996			
6	International Junior Science Olympiad	IJSO	since 2004	Bulgaria	TBD	
7	International Earth Science Olympiad	IESO	since 2007	Italy	Japan	
8	International Olympiad on Astronomy and Astrophysics	IOAA	since 2007	Vietnam	TBD	
9	International Olympiad in Artificial Intelligence	IOAI	since 2024	Kazakhstan	Singapore	

== Social sciences ==
#	Science Olympiad	Abbreviation	Years	2026 host country	2027 host country	References
10	International Philosophy Olympiad	IPO	since 1993	Poland	TBD	
11	International Geography Olympiad	iGeo	since 1996	Turkey	Latvia	
12	International Linguistics Olympiad	IOL	since 2003	Romania	Thailand	
13	International Economics Olympiad	IEO	since 2018	China	Japan	

== See also ==
- RoboCup
- Tuymaada
- WorldSkills
