= Galina Ivanovna Tsukanova =

Russian scientist

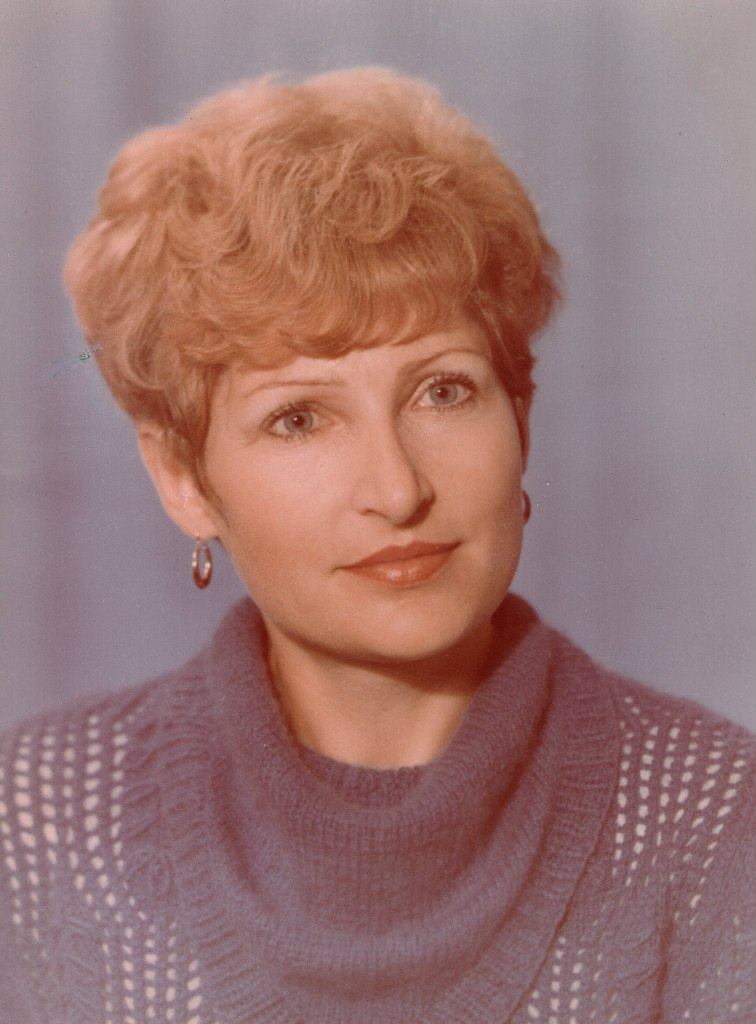
- Galina Ivanovna Tsukanova
- Born: 26 February 1942
- Died: 24 November 2014 (aged 72)
- Awards: Medal "In Commemoration of the 300th Anniversary of Saint Petersburg", USSR State Prize
- Scientific career
- Institutions: Saint Petersburg National Research University of Information Technologies, Mechanics and Optics

Galina Ivanovna Tsukanova (Russian: Галина Ивановна Цуканова, 26 February 1942 – 24 November 2014) was a Soviet and Russian scientist and engineer. She received a PhD in Engineering Science in 1969, in addition to being a senior scientist, docent, and USSR State Prize holder.

== Biography ==
Galina Ivanovna Tsukanova (maiden surname Tikhomirova) was born 26 February 1942, in the village of Manuilovo, Kaliningrad Oblast. In 1955, after the death of her mother, her family moved to Leningrad, where she graduated from school in 1959 and entered ITMO. Galina graduated with honours from ITMO in 1965 with a specialization in Optical Devices. During her degree studies, she was a Lenin Scholarship holder. In 1968 she occupied the position of engineer in the Department of Optic-Mechanical Devices. In 1968 Galina received a PhD in Engineering Science, her thesis was devoted to problems of Aberrations in Space Optics (Russian: Исследование и расчет астрономических асферических объективов с коррекцией полевых аберраций). At the time, Prof. Dr. Vladimir Churilovski was her scientific supervisor.

Tsukanova worked at ITMO University for many years. During her career, she occupied the following positions in the Optical Devices Design Department (Mikhail Mikhaylovich Rusinov—head of the Department): Engineer (1968–70), Senior Scientist (1970-72), Docent (from 1972).

Tsukanova made a significant contribution to the Vega program, as she was the head of the group designing optical devices. She was awarded the USSR State Prize in 1986 for that contribution. Optical devices designed by Galina Tsukanova were used for filming Halley's Comet.

She was a designer of catadioptric lenses.

== Family ==
Father – Tikhomirov Ivan Arsenevich (Russian: Тихомиров Иван Арсеньевич) (1907–1981) was a technician in Manuilovo village. During World War II he volunteered for the army in the rank of Private.

Mother – Babaeva Aleksandra Vasilevna (Russian: Бабаева Александра Васильевна), was a shop manager in Manuilovo village.

Husband – Tsukanov Anatolii Anatolevich (Russian: Цуканов Анатолий Анатольевич) was born in Leningrad in the family of lieutenant-commander. In 1955 entered a military academy, named after Makarov (Sevastopol). In 1958 transferred to Leningrad Institute of Precise Mechanics and Optics. Graduated in 1963 with a specialization in Precise Mechanical Devices. In 1975 received a PhD degree. In 1981 became a Docent of the Optical Devices Department of ITMO. From 1978 until 2004 he occupied a Docent position in Optical Devices Design Department. He made a serious contribution to high-speed filming technology.

Daughter – Tsukanova Olga Anatolevna (Russian: Цуканова Ольга Анатольевна) was born in 1980. Doctor of Economics, Professor of Economics and Strategic Management Department of ITMO. Graduated from ITMO in 2002 with a specialization in Informational Systems in Economy.

== Research ==
The research of Galina Tsukanova was devoted to the design of Space Optical Devices. She authored more than 80 scientific papers, and more than 17 patents.

Some of her works are:

- G. I. Tsukanova, A. V. Bakholdin, Special branches of applied optics—Study Guide.
- G. I. Tsukanova, G. V. Karpova, O. V. Bagdasarova, Applied optics—Study Guide, 2013.
- A. V. Bakholdin, G. I. Romanova, G. I. Tsukanova, Theory and Methods of Optical Devices Design—2011.

== Awards ==
- Medal "In Commemoration of the 300th Anniversary of Saint Petersburg", 1986.
- S. P. Korolev Prize, 1985.
- USSR State Prize, 2004.
