= Tsukanov =

Tsukanov (Russian: Цуканов) is a Russian masculine surname, its feminine counterpart is Tsukanova. It may refer to

- Andrei Tsukanov (born 1977), Russian football player
- Andriy Tsukanov (born 1980), Ukrainian Paralympic football player
- Galina Ivanovna Tsukanova (1942–2014), Soviet and Russian scientist and engineer
- Mariya Tsukanova (1924–1945), Hero of the Soviet Union
- Nikolay Tsukanov (born 1965), Russian politician, psychologist and businessman
- Sergei Tsukanov (born 1986), Russian football player
- Viktor Tsukanov (born 2006), Ukrainian football player
