= Vladimir Vasiliev =

Vladimir Vasiliev may refer to:

- Vladimir Vasiliev (dancer) (born 1940), dancer with the Bolshoi Ballet
- Vladimir Vasilyev (rower) (born 1948), Soviet Olympic rower
- Vladimir Vasilyev (politician) (born 1949), Russian politician
- Vladimir Vasilyev (rally driver) (born 1969), Russian rally raid driver
- Vladimir Vasilyev (sailor) (1935–2003), Soviet Olympic sailor
- Vladimir Vasilyev (scientist) (born 1951), scientist and rector at ITMO University
- Vladimir Vasilyev (writer) (born 1967), science fiction writer

== See also ==
- Vasiliev
