= Vladimir Vasilyev (scientist) =

Russian computer scientist and professor

- Владимир Васильев
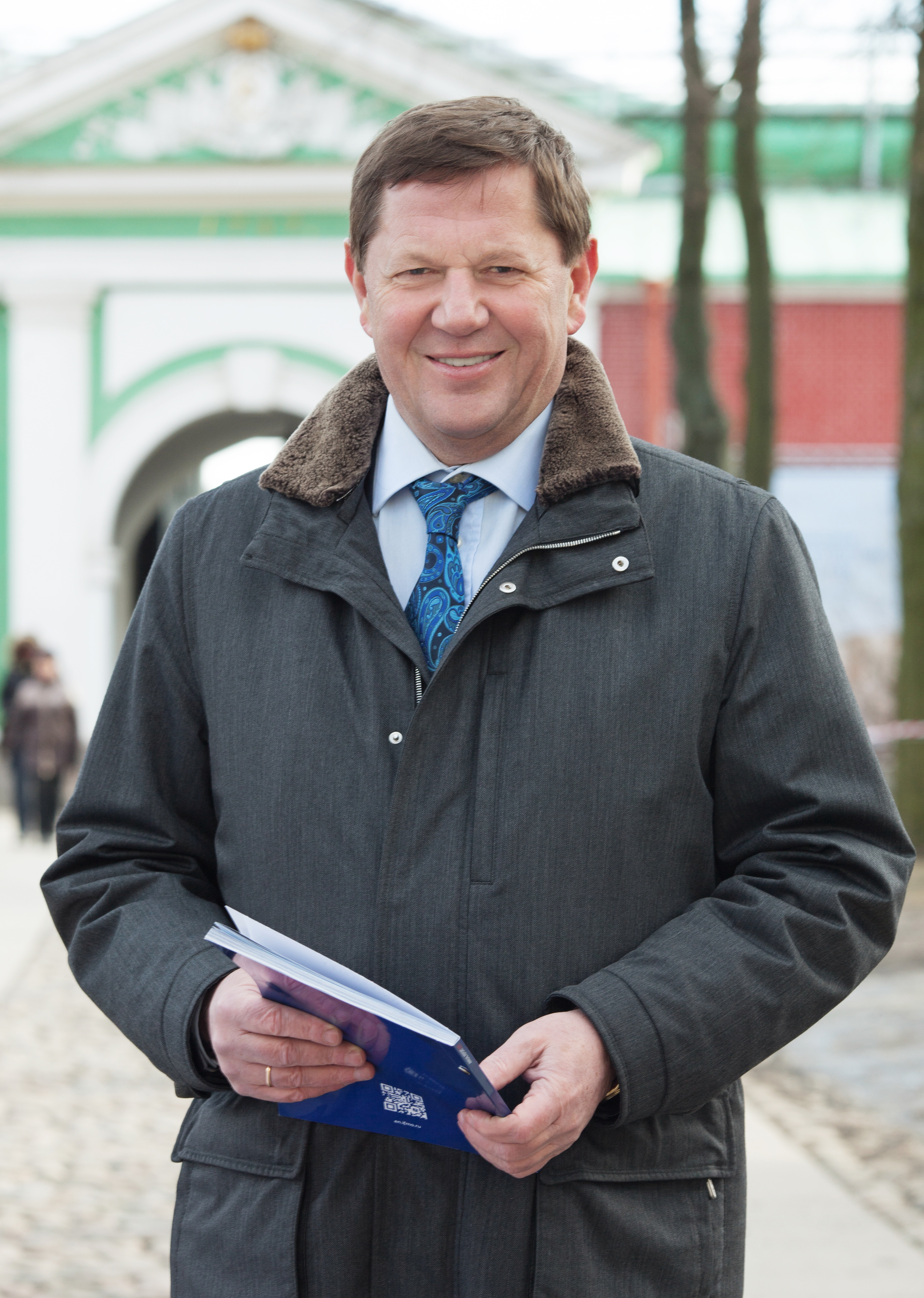
- Vasilyev in 2015

Rector of the ITMO University
- Incumbent
- Assumed office December 1995

Personal details
- Born: April 1, 1951 (age 75) Stavropol, Russian SFSR, Soviet Union
- Children: Alisa; Arsenii
- Profession: scientist, professor
- Website: ifmo.ru/person/1/vasilev.htm

Vladimir Nikolaevich Vasilyev (Russian: Владимир Николаевич Васильев; born April 1, 1951) is a Russian scientist, researcher, professor and acting rector at ITMO University since 1996. Head of the Council of Rectors of St. Petersburg Universities (since 2004), corresponding member of the Russian Academy of Education (since 2008), corresponding member of the Russian Academy of Sciences (since 2011). Since August 6, 2012 – member of the Government of the Russian Federation Expert Council. Honored citizen of St. Petersburg since 2013.

== Biography ==
Dr. Vasilyev graduated from Leningrad Polytechnic Institute named after Kalinin in 1974 with a degree in thermal physics. He continued graduate work at the same institute till 1978 and in 1980 defended his Master's thesis titled "Thermal Physics and Molecular Physics."

From 1978 till 1983 he worked at the Stavropol Polytechnic Institute where he held the positions of senior researcher, then assistant and associate professor.

=== Work at ITMO University ===
Dr. Vasilyev joined Leningrad Institute of Precise Mechanics and Optics (LITMO) in 1983. In 1989 he defended his doctoral thesis in "Optical Instrumentation" and "Thermal Physics and Molecular Physics."

In 1990 Vasilyev was awarded a PhD in Technical Sciences. In 1991 he founded and became the head of the department of Computer Technological Systems, which was renamed to the department of Computer Technologies in 1992, and in 1992 received the designation of professor. In 1993 he was appointed the first vice-rector.

Under his leadership, in 1994 the foundations were laid for establishing a federal university computer network RUNNet. His team together with several Russian universities set up satellite communications network based on Vuztelecomzentr – a research center for computer communications in higher education, and in collaboration with the largest European academic service provider NORDUnet.

The new satellite communications systems, developed under Vasilyev's supervision, enabled transmitting data across local and global networks, including the first Russian ATM data transmission system between St. Petersburg and Moscow.

For the development of the network, Vasilyev and his team received the Government of the Russian Federation Award in Education in 2000.

In 1995, the Conference of University's Employees elected Vasilyev ITMO University's Rector for five years. He's been reelected four times, in 2001, 2006, 2011 and 2015.

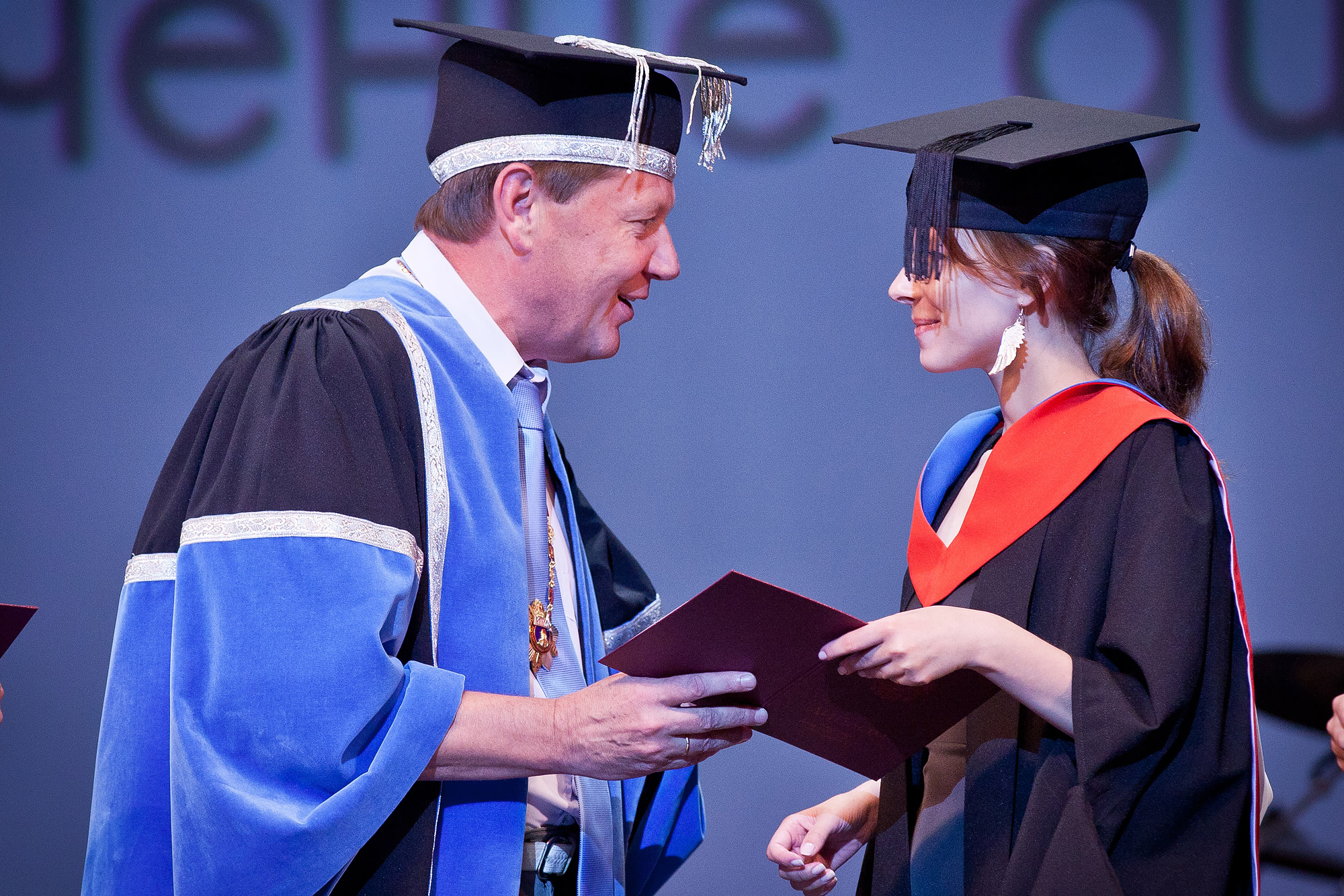
Rector Vladimir Vasilyev at the presentation of diplomas, 2013

In 2000, Vasilyev was awarded the designation of "Honored Worker of Science of the Russian Federation." In May 2006 he received a diploma from the State Duma "for a major contribution to Russian education."

Vasilyev became a laureate of the President of the Russian Federation Award in Education in 2003 and 2005, and in 2008 once again received the Government of the Russian Federation Award in Education.

The President of the Russian Federation Award of 2005 recognized the achievements of the team that included the dean of IT and Programming Department Dr. Parfenov and Computer Technologies Department assistants Elizarov and Stankevich for their work "Concept development and organizational structure, teaching materials and software for an innovative system of training highly qualified personnel in the field of IT."

The professor is a scientific director for research part of federal targeted programs, including "Electronic Russia," “Development of a Unified Educational Information Environment," “Integration of Russia's Science and Higher Education," “Federal Program of Education Development," “Research in Priority Science and Technology Areas." He's also the founder of the University's research and pedagogical school "Computer, network and telecommunication technologies." It was also his initiative to launch and publish "ITMO University Science and Technology Gazette," that is now among the leading peer-reviewed journals of the Higher Attestation Commission.

Official income in 2012 – 7.4 million rubles. His family's assets include a 100 sq. m apartment and a small share in a 60-meter apartment. In 2013, he declared 6.5 million rubles.

In an interview to Fontanka.ru, Vasilyev noted that his income comes from contracts with the Ministry of Education and Science as well as research and instruction.

=== Non-university activities ===
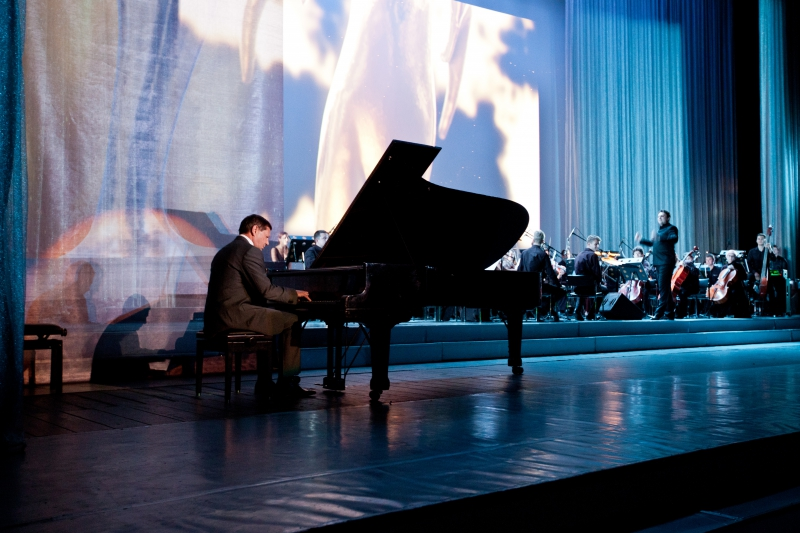
Graduation at the ITMO University, Oktyabrskiy Big Concert Hall. July 2014

- 1999 – member of the International Academy of Higher Education
- 2003 – member of the Prokhorov Academy of Engineering Sciences
- April 2004 – head of the St. Petersburg University Rectors Council
- 2006 – vice-president of the Russian Union of Rectors, head of the Rozhdestvensky Optical Society. In November he was elected a co-chair of a nonprofit organization "Russian Pedagogical Assembly."
- 2008 – corresponding member of the Russian Academy of Education
- October 2009 – unanimously re-elected as the head of the St. Petersburg University Rectors Council
- 2011 – corresponding member of the Russian Academy of Sciences. In July he joined the President's Council for Science, Technology and Education
- 2012 – joined the Government of the Russian Federation Expert Council, established by Dmitry Medvedev
- 2013 – deputy chair of the Higher Attestation Commission

Dr. Vasilyev is a member of the Technical Council of Russia's Ministry of Education and Science, member of the scientific council on issues of information technology in education, heads three specialized dissertation councils, is a member of editorial boards for journals "Computer Instruments in Education," “Proceedings of Universities. Instrumentation," “Optical Journal," is a member of Government of St. Petersburg Research Council, National Personnel Training Fund, as well as international scientific societies and working groups.

=== Political activities ===
In October 2007 Vasilyev was among the top three candidates in the regional list of the "United Russia" party.

In 2013, St. Petersburg Governor Georgy Poltavchenko nominated Vasilyev for Honored Citizen. The candidacy was approved by 40 members of the Legislative Assembly of Saint Petersburg and in May the rector was awarded the designation "Honored Citizen of St. Petersburg."

In 2014 Vasilyev was on the list of candidates for the Speaker of the Federation Council.

Currently he is an advisor to St. Petersburg governor.

On March 6, 2022, during the Russian invasion of Ukraine, he signed a letter in support of President Vladimir Putin.

== Personal life ==
Vasilyev has two children, Alisa (born 1974) and Arsenii (born 1977).

== Hobbies ==
In September 2014 and June 2015, Vladimir Vasilyev headed two bicycle races in St. Petersburg on Yelagin Island. After the first race, ITMO students and staff were joined by fellow riding enthusiasts from other universities.

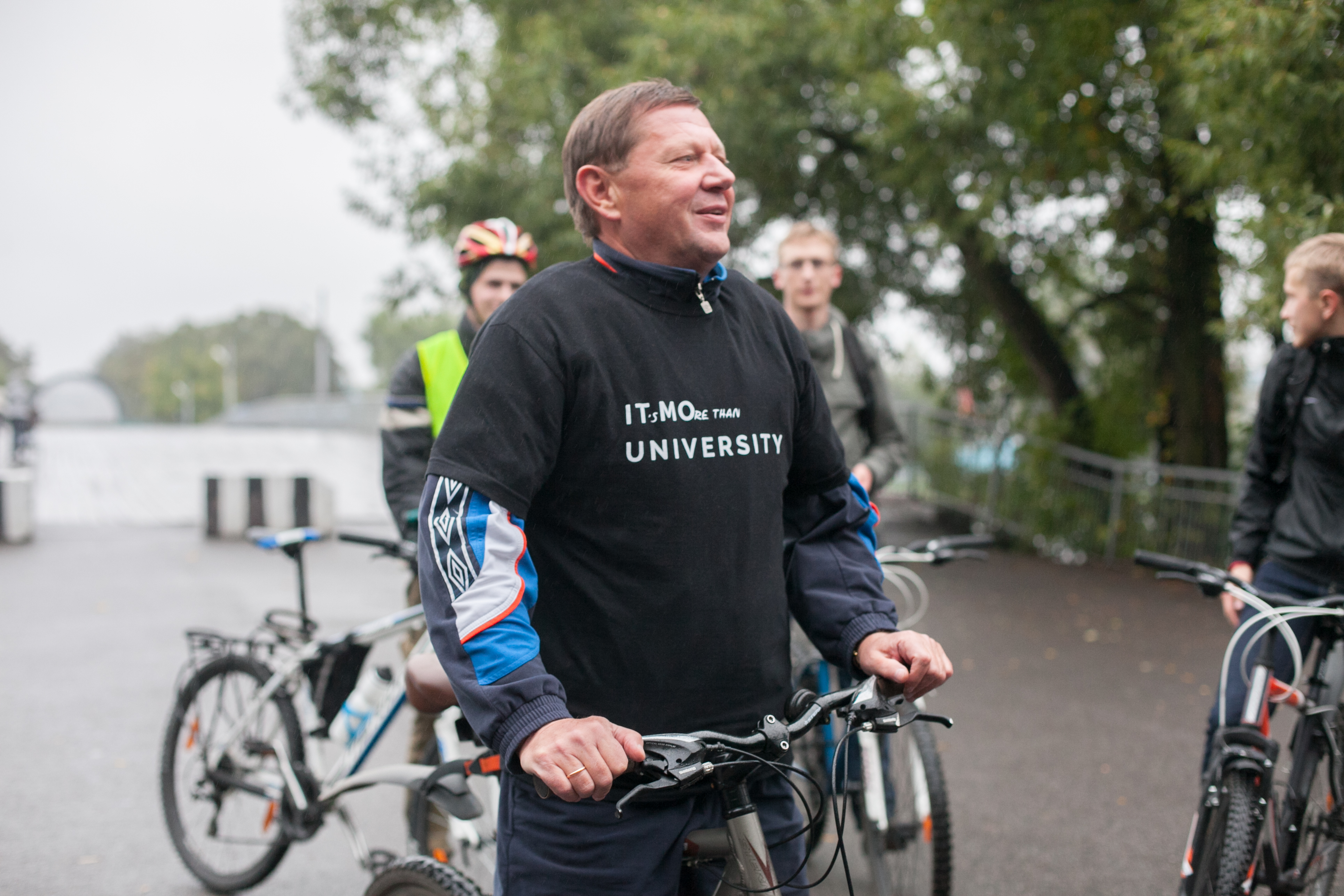
Vladimir Vasiliev at bike ride. 2015

I try to ride my bike as often as possible. It's important not just to spend time and energy on science but also on active sports. We want to raise strong and healthy science professionals.

— Vladimir Vasilyev. "St. Petersburg" TV Channel (2015)

== Honors and awards ==
- Order of Honor and Dignity "Russia Reigning" (2005)
- Order of Honor (2007)
- Merit Award of the IV degree (2011)
- Anniversary medal "300 Anniversary of the Russian Navy" (1996)
- Medal "300 Anniversary of St. Petersburg" (2004)
- Government of the Russian Federation Award in Education (2000, 2008)
- President of the Russian Federation Award in Education (2003, 2005)
