= Aleksandr Grammatin =

Soviet and Russian scientist (1931–2014)

Alexander Panteleimonovich Grammatin (Russian: Александр Пантелеймонович Грамматин; January 6, 1931, in Leningrad – August 28, 2014, in St. Petersburg) was a Soviet and Russian scientist in the field of computational optics, the developer of the theory and author of the first national program for the automated calculation of computer parameters of optical systems by criteria of image quality. He was the Doctor of Technical Sciences, professor, the USSR State Prize laureate (1977) and holder of the Prize of the Council of Ministers of the USSR (1983).

== Biography ==
He was born on January 6, 1931, in Leningrad, in the family of a civil engineer. During the Siege of Leningrad period, he studied at school, in 1945, Grammatin attended the Leningrad Military Mechanical College, which he graduated with honors in 1949. Since 1948, he worked in the Optical Computing Office of the Optical and Mechanical Plant No. 357 "Progress". He rose from the rank of the technician to the design project leader of the enterprise, working on the design of optical systems for Microscopes and aiming sights. In the same year, he entered the evening department of the Leningrad Institute of Precise Mechanics and Optics (LIPMO, now it is the St. Petersburg National Research University of Information Technologies, Mechanics and Optics). In 1955, he graduated with honors from LIPMO majoring in "Optomechanical Instruments". In his off-work hours, Grammatin also attended the correspondence postgraduate course of the State Optical Institute named after S. I. Vavilov (now it's JSC "Vavilov State Optical Institute") under the direction of D. Y. Halpern. In 1959, he was the first in the Soviet Union, who created a program of automated calculation of optical systems. Continuing research in the direction of automation of designing optical systems, he defended his thesis. In 1976, he earned the degree of Doctor of Engineering, with a thesis devoted to the development of opto-mechanical equipment for the microelectronics manufacturing. From 1962 to 1998, he worked in the Vavilov State Optical Institute. He successively worked as the chief of laboratory, the head of the scientific department and the branch. He also led the creation of software systems for computer-aided design of optical systems. In 1970–1988, he headed the development of optical systems for production and quality control of microelectronic products. In 1976, he began teaching at LIPMO. Since 1982, he was a professor at the Department of the Optical instruments Theory. Since 1996, he became a professor at the Department of Applied and Computer Optics of the Optical-Information Systems and Technologies Faculty in the ITMO. Since 1998, he got permanent job in the ITMO with the combined duties of the chief research associate at the State Optical Institute.

Grammatin published over 200 scientific works, including works written in collaboration, and he trained more than ten candidates of sciences. He was a co-author of several Patented Inventions in the field of optics. He was a member of Editorial boards of "The Optical Periodical" and "The Optics and Spectroscopy" Magazines.

He died on August 28, 2014, in St. Petersburg.

== Awards ==
- The Order of the Badge of Honour (1983)
- The USSR State Prize (1977)
- The Award of the Council of Ministers of the USSR (1983)
- The Medal "In Commemoration of the 300th Anniversary of Saint Petersburg" (2004)
