= Mikhail Rusinov =

Russian optical scientist (1909–2004)

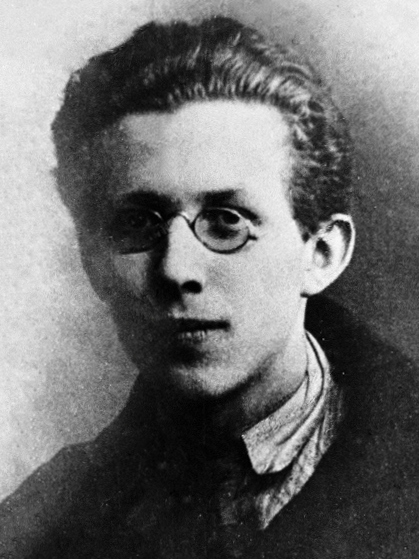
- Rusinov in 1928
- Born: 11 February 1909; Saint Petersburg, Russian Empire
- Died: 29 September 2004 (aged 95); Saint Petersburg, Russia
- Education: Saint Petersburg State University
- Spouse: Nadezhda Agaltsova
- Scientific career
- Fields: Optics
- Workplaces: Vavilov State Optical Institute

Mikhail Mikhailovich Rusinov (Russian: Михаил Михайлович Русинов, 11 February 1909 – 29 September 2004) was a Russian scientist specialising in optics. He co-founded the USSR Science School of Computational Optics and discovered several optical phenomena, including aberration vignetting (1938), projection centre distortion (1957), and existence of second-order aberration (1986). The phenomenon of projection centre distortion became the basis for engineering photometry.

== Biography ==
Rusinov was born into the family of a high school mathematics teacher. His father Mikhail Nikolayevich Rusinov (Russian: Михаил Николаевич Русинов) taught at the N. A. Rimsky-Korsakov Saint Petersburg State Conservatory. His mother Yevdokiya Vasilyevna Rusinova (Russian: Евдокия Васильевна Русинова) studied piano under Anton Rubinstein. Many well-known Russian composers were family friends, including Nikolai Rimsky-Korsakov and Alexander Glazunov. Mikhail Rusinov inherited his mother's love of music and composed waltzes as an adult.

Rusinov attended school from 1917 to 1920; in 1921 he entered a trade school that eventually became the Professional School of Precise Mechanics and Optics. In 1921 it became a Technical School and Precise Mechanics and Optics University. After graduation from technical school at the age of 18, Rusinov joined the Leningrad Optical Mechanical Association (LOMO) as an optician designer. There he performed calculations for submarine periscopes.

From 1929 till 1933 Rusinov worked at the USSR Optical and Mechanical Society. Beginning in 1931 he also worked in the Central Office of Geodesy and Cartography. From 1932 until 1942 he held positions of Senior Engineer, Head of the Laboratory and Senior Researcher in Geodesy at the Aerial Photography and Cartography Central Institute. From 1930 to 1935 he taught at the Civil Air Engineering Institute of LITMO. In 1938 he received his PhD degree and in 1939 he was promoted to Senior Researcher.

In 1941 Rusinov received a Doctor degree. During World War II, from 1942 till 1943 he was a Senior Designer Assistant at the Factory No. 393 in the Moscow region. From 1943 till 1944 he taught at the Bauman Moscow State Technical University. Returning to Saint Petersburg in October 1944, he became the Scientific Supervisor of the North-East Aerogeodesy Institute Laboratory of Optics and Mechanics.

In 1946 he received a permanent position at ITMO University. In 1958 he worked on design of wide angle lenses at the Geodesy, Aerophotography and Cartography Central Research Institute.

Rusinov's scientific work is closely associated with ITMO University. He worked at ITMO from its foundation, holding the position of Department Head for more than 40 years and was Scientific Supervisor of its laboratory, which later became the Technical Optics Laboratory. He became Professor of the Applied and Computational Optics Department in 1997.

Rusinov wrote more than 152 scientific papers (18 monographs), and held 320 Inventor's Certificates and 22 patents (7 in Russia). In 1995 he published a monograph on Off-Centre Optical Systems Composition. He received most of his state awards for development of wide-angle lenses for aerophotography.

Rusinov died on 29 September 2004. He was buried at Volkovo Cemetery in Saint Petersburg.

== Personal life ==
Rusnov was married to Nadezhda Agaltsova, a colleague who shared with him the 1982 Lenin Prize for the development of wide-angle aerophotography lenses. He was an accomplished piano player and music composer. He was also an avid winter swimmer and continued this activity through his eighties. As a teenager Rusinov sustained an eye injury that affected him through most of his life. His vision deteriorated with age, urging him to change from long-distance winter swimming to dipping in an ice bath.

== Awards and honors ==
- Three Stalin Prizes (1941, 1949, 1950)
- Order of Lenin (1961)
- USSR State Prize (1967)
- Order of the Red Banner of Labour (1981)
- Lenin Prize (1982)
