= Vladimir Churilovski =

- Born: 25 May 1898; Saint Petersburg, Russian Empire
- Died: 11 November 1983 (aged 85); Leningrad, Soviet Union
- Education: College of Precise Mechanics and Optics
- Scientific career
- Fields: Optics
- Workplaces: College of Precise Mechanics and Optics, Institute for Precise Mechanics and Optics

Vladimir Nikolaevich Churilovski (Russian: Владимир Николаевич Чуриловский; 25 May 1898 in Saint Petersburg – 11 November 1983) was a professor and one of the founders of the Pedagogical School of Applied and Computational Optics. He was a major contributor to Russian science and was awarded with the Order of the Red Star, Order of the Red Banner, among other honors. He was the first dean of the ITMO Department of Optics.

== Biography ==
Vladimir Churlovski was born in 1898 into the family of a printing house worker. Churlovski entered the St. Petersburg State University of Communication, but had to leave in his third year as he was not able to pay for his education. After the 1917 Russian Revolution, Churlovski gained admission to the College of Precise Mechanics and Optics. He graduated from the college in 1925 and started his science career. He managed to become the head of the Optical Design Department. At the same time, he was studying a course about the theoretical aspects of optical instrument design in the College of Precise Mechanics and Optics. In 1925 The College of Precise Mechanics and Optics became the Institute for Precise Mechanics and Optics. Churilovski was elected dean and kept this position for 12 years. In 1935 Churlovski became a professor within the Optical Apparatus department. In 1947 he received his doctorate. In 1953 he left his position of dean due to health problems, but continued teaching for 16 years. In 1966 Churlovski was awarded the degree of Honoured Master of Sciences and Engineering. In 1969 Churlovski officially retired, but continued consulting colleagues and only completely retired at the age of 83. Churilovski died in 1983, at the age of 85.

== Work ==
Vladimir Churilovski patented over 50 devices and was an author of more than 200 papers. His most well known works were devoted to high order chromatic aberrations and prism system chromaticism.
