= Gennadiy Dulnev =

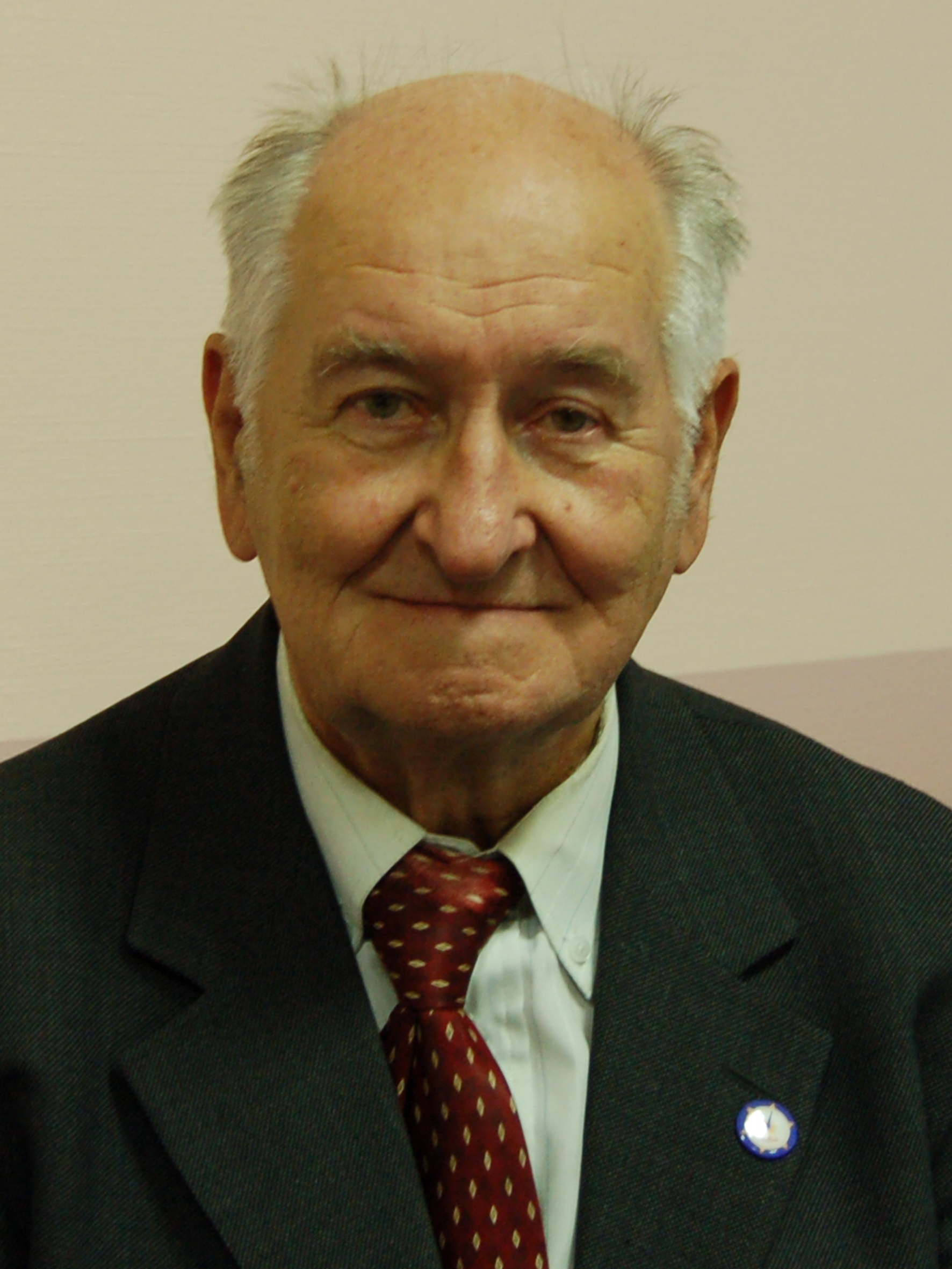
- Gennadiy Nikolaevich Dulnev
- Born: 3 May 1927; Novokubansk
- Died: 11 December 2012 (aged 85); Saint Petersburg, Russia
- Education: ITMO University
- Awards: Order of Honour, Medal "In Commemoration of the 300th Anniversary of Saint Petersburg"
- Scientific career
- Fields: Thermal physics
- Workplaces: College of Precise Mechanics and Optics, Institute for Precise Mechanics and Optics

Gennadiy Nikolaevich Dulnev (Russian: Ду́льнев Генна́дий Никола́евич, 3 May 1927, Novokubansk—11 December 2012 Saint Petersburg ) Professor, PHd. Was LITMO University elected chancellor. Professor of Computational Thermal Physics and Electrophysical Monitoring Department of ITMO. A member of Russian Academy of Natural Sciences

Occupied position of the Head of North-West RAS Scientific Council in Thermal Physics and Thermal Energy Engineering. Also, was director of Energo-Informational Center.

Professional Mountaineer. Made first ascent in 1949.

== Biography ==
- 1944—50 studied in LITMO University at Department of Engineering and Physics.
- 1950—53 performed postgraduate study at Thermal Instruments Department
- 1953 Got PhD in Physics
- 1959 Got Docent degree
- 1958 Published Thesis devoted to problem of heat exchange in machines with energy sources.
- 1959 Got Doctor degree.
- 1961 Was elected professor of Heat Instruments and Measuring Devices Department.

At 1951 took a position in LITMO (now Saint Petersburg National Research University of Information Technologies, Mechanics and Optics).

- 1951—60 Occupied positions of an assistant, senior lecturer and Docent
- 1958—95 Became the Head of Thermal Physics Department
- 1960—74 Became the Head of Computational Thermal Physics and Electrophysical Monitoring Department
- 1961—62 Obtained position of Vice-Rector at Scientific Problems
- 1974—86 Became Rector of ITMO
- From 1990 occupied director position of Energo-Informational Center.
- At 1995 became professor of Computational Thermal Physics and Electrophysics Monitoring Department.

Was one of the leaders of scientific school of heat and mass exchange in instrumentation area. Was widely known as a specialist in Materials Thermal Properties and Thermal Physics. Also worked on some problems of Bioinformatics.

Occupied chairman position of Mass and Heat Transfer in Engineering and Production Scientific Society of USSR Scientific and Engineer committee (1974–91).

Author of more than 300 scientific papers, 4 textbooks and 8 monographs.

Was Doctoral advisor for 11 Science Doctors and Scientific Supervisor for 40 PhD Students.

Awarded Order of Honour (Russia) (2000), Medal "In Commemoration of the 300th Anniversary of Saint Petersburg"(2004) and many others.

Was awarded degree of Honoured master of sciences and engineering in 1982.

== List of Monographs ==
- G. N. Dulnev (Russian: Теплообмен в радиоэлектронных устройствах). Energy Press, Moscow, 1968.
- G. N. Dulnev, E. M. Semyashkin (Russian: Теплообмен в радиоэлектронных аппаратах). Energy Press, Moscow, 1968.
- G. N. Dulnev, N. N. Tarnovski (Russian: Тепловые режимы в электронной аппаратуры), Moscow, 1971.
- G. N. Dulnev, Yu. P. Zarichnyak (Russian: Теплопроводность смесей и композиционных материалов), Energy Press, Moscow, 1974.
- G. N. Dulnev (Russian: Тепло- и массообмен в радиоэлектронной аппаратуре), textbook. High School Press, Moscow, 1984.
- G. N. Dulnev, A. P. Belyakov (Russian: Тепловые трубы в электронных системах стабилизации аппаратуры). Moscow, 1985.
- G. N. Dulnev, V. N. Novikov (Russian: Процессы переноса в неоднородных средах). Energy Press, Moscow, 1991.
- G. N. Dulnev, A. V. Sharkov (Russian: Системы охлажения приборов), LITMO, Leningrad., 1984
- G. N. Dulnev, V. G. Parfenov, A. V. Sigalov (Russian: Применение ЭВМ для решения задач теплообмена). High School Press, Moscow, 1990.
- G. N. Dulnev Introduction to Synergetics (Russian: Введение в синергетику). Prospect Press, Saint Peterburg, 1998.
- G. N. Dulnev Exchange of Energy and Information in Nature. (Russian: Энергоинформационный обмен в природе) / Stand-forward Scientists of ITMO Series. ITMO, Iva Press, Saint Peterburg, 2000. — 140 pages. ISBN 5-7577-0062-9
- G. N. Dulnev In search of Fine Worlds. Descriptions of Scientific Experiments devoted to Human Psychic Ability (Russian: В поисках тонкого мира. Описание научных экспериментов по изучению экстрасенсорных способностей). Vies Press, Saint Peterburg, 2004. — 286 pages.
