= Nadezhda Agaltsova =

Russian optical scientist (born 1938)

- Надежда Алексеевна Агальцова
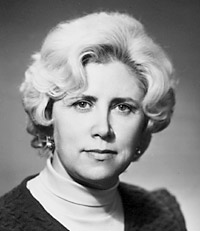
- Born: Nadezhda Alekseyevna Agaltsova; 3 February 1938 (age 88)
- Spouse: Mikhail Rusinov
- Awards: Lenin Prize

Academic background
- Education: ITMO University
- Thesis: (1972)

Academic work
- Discipline: Physicist
- Sub-discipline: Optics

Nadezhda Alekseyevna Agaltsova (Russian: Надежда Алексеевна Агальцова; born 3 February 1938) is a Russian scientist. In 1982 she won the Lenin Prize for the development of wide-angle aerial survey lenses for cartographic purposes.

== Biography ==
Agaltsova was born in 1938. In 1961, she graduated from the Optics department of the Leningrad Institute of Precision Mechanics and Optics (LIPMO). Since March 1961, she worked under the direction of the professor Mikhail M. Rusinov. Her developments ensured the creation of lenses for aerial survey like “Russar-55”, “Russar-63”, “Russar-71”, as well as a fine high-aperture wide-angle lens of the sixth generation, “Russar-93”. It became the prototype of the lens Russar-96 for the space project Mars 96. From 1969 to 1971, Nadezhda Agaltsova underwent postgraduate training in the Central Research Institute of Geodesy, Aerial Survey and Cartography, and in 1972 she defended her thesis, with the result that the academic degree of Candidate of Science was conferred upon her.

== Awards ==
Agaltsova was awarded with such insignia as "Aeroflot’s Expert", "Geodesy and Cartography Expert", "Honorary Land Surveyor", as well as gold and bronze medals of the Exhibition of Economic Achievements.

- 1960 — "The best inventor of the Main Department of Geodesy and Cartography" and "The inventor of the USSR"
- 1982 — The Lenin Prize for development of wide-angle aerophotography lenses, shared with her husband Mikhail Rusinov.

== Works ==
Agaltsova published 35 scientific papers, received 22 invention certificates, and held 5 patents of the Russian Federation.
