= Viktor Zverev =

Soviet and Russian physicist (1935–2018)

- Born: Viktor Alekseyevich Zverev; October 26, 1935; Leningrad, Soviet Union
- Died: March 18, 2018 (aged 82); Saint Petersburg, Russia
- Awards: Lenin Prize
- Scientific career
- Fields: Optics
- Workplaces: Saint Petersburg National Research University of Information Technologies, Mechanics and Optics

Viktor Alekseyevich Zverev (Russian: Виктор Алексеевич Зверев, 26 October 1935 – 18 March 2018) was a Soviet and Russian physicist, specialist in optics, Professor at Saint-Petersburg National Research University of Information Technologies, Mechanics and Optics. He was a member of Vavilov State Optical Institute Academic Council; the editor of the Journal of Optical Technology; co-chairman of Education Council and the chairman of Russian Optical Society regional office; chairman of Physical Optics branch and member of Academics' House of Saint-Petersburg. Viktor Zverev had holed position of the member of the Saint-Petersburg Academics' House and of the position Chairman of the Saint-Petersburg Academics' House Science Councils Administrative Committee. Professor Zverev is elected Chairman of Optical Council of Academy of Science and Art, named after Peter the Great; Professor also has a position of the Leading Scientific Advisor of Academy of Science and Art, named after Peter the Great and is a member of International Eurasian Scientific Academy.

Viktor Zverev had graduated from LITMO with specialization if Optical Devices in 1961. After this, he worked for LOMO, where he advanced from the position of Engineer to that of Group Leading Engineer (1961–89). Prof. Zverev had been working in ITMO since 1970. He occupied the following positions: Head of the Department of Optical Devices (1989); Head of the Department of Optical Devices Design (1990–96). In 1970 Prof. Zverev received a PhD degree in Engineering and became a full Professor in 1983.

Viktor Zverev was the author of 200 scientific papers, and over 70 inventor's certificates.

Zverev was the recipient of several awards for his achievements, including the Order of the Red Banner of Labour in 1974 and the Lenin Prize in 1978.
