= Mark Veyngerov =

Physicist

Mark Leonidovich Veyngerov
- Mark Leonidovich Veyngerov
- Education: Saint Petersburg State University
- Awards: USSR State Prize, Order of the Badge of Honour
- Scientific career
- Fields: Physics, Optics
- Workplaces: ITMO University

Mark Leonidovich Veyngerov (Russian: Марк Леонидович Вейнгеров, 1903–1973) was a Soviet Physicist, USSR State Prize 1946 awardee for papers in the field of Optics.

== Biography ==
Mark Veyngerov was born in Saint Petersburg in the family of medical doctors: Cecilia Borisovna Brushteyn (Russian: Цецилия Борисовна Бруштейн, ?-1953) was a physiotherapist and Leonid Iosifovich Veyngerov (Russian: Леонид Иосифович Вейнгеров, 1867-1934) was a wide-known balneologist. Leonid Veyngerov was the author of such well-known medical books as Compendium to recipe with a description of the most common drugs that are not included in the Russian pharmacopoeia (Russian: "Краткое руководство по общей и частной рецептуре с описанием наиболее употребительных препаратов, не вошедших в российскую фармакопею"). He also was the leader of the "Aid Society for Poor Jews" and was the Main Secretary of St. Petersburg Medical Society in 1907–1911.

Mark Leonidovich Veyngerov graduated from Physics department of Saint Petersburg State University in 1925. He worked on PhD under scientific supervision of academician Alexander Alexeyevich Lebedev.

At 1931 he was hired at the State Optics Institute and had been working in Infrared Optics Laboratory for many years. Before World War II he taught physics in Mozhaisky Military Space Academy.

After World War II he became lecturer in LITMO. He occupied the following positions: Professor of General Physics Department (1945-1948); Head of the Infrared Optics Department (1948-1954); Professor (1954-1956, 1965-1967) and the Head of the Physical Optics and Spectroscopy Department (1956-1965).

Mark Veyngerov received the following science degrees: PhD (1930); Docent (1935); Doctor Nauk (1940), Professor (1942).

He designed Infrared Radiation Detector on the basis of Bimetallic Plate Vacuum Diode (1932), designed Selective Optic-Acoustical Detector -- Spectrophone with wide sensitivity spectrum (1937). In collaboration with S.M. Luchin designed non-selective Optic-Acoustical Detector (1941).

He was Awarded USSR State Prize in 1946 for developing of Express Optic-Acoustical Gas Analysis. Also awarded Order of the Badge of Honour and other medals.
