= Andrei Tsukanov =

Russian footballer (born 1977)

Personal information
- Full name: Andrei Nikolayevich Tsukanov
- Date of birth: 15 April 1977 (age 49)
- Height: 1.82 m (5 ft 11 1/2 in)
- Position: Midfielder

Youth career
- FC Torpedo Moscow

Senior career*
Years	Team	Apps	(Gls)
1994–1997	FC Torpedo Moscow	3	(0)
1994–1997	→ FC Torpedo-d Moscow (loans)	139	(3)
1998	FC Tyumen	8	(0)
1999–2003	FC Spartak Shchyolkovo	156	(3)
2004	FC Sodovik Sterlitamak	11	(0)
- * Club domestic league appearances and goals

Andrei Nikolayevich Tsukanov (Russian: Андрей Николаевич Цуканов; born 15 April 1977) is a former Russian football player.
