= RUNNet =

Russian academic telecoms network

- Company type: Not-for-profit
- Industry: Telecommunications network
- Headquarters: Moscow, St. Petersburg, Russia
- Website: www.runnet.ru/en/

RUNNet (Russian university network) was established in 1994 on the initiative of the State University of Fine Mechanics and Optics by the State Committee of Higher Education as a key branch of the Russian Universities program. In the same year, an Agreement on Cooperation between RUNNet and NORDUnet was signed.

The purpose of RUNNet is to provide a single common informational space to make available Russian and foreign research and educational resources while also integrating Russian information into the world community.

== History ==
Russian Federal University Network RUNNet was established in 1994 as part of the National Program "Universities of Russia" as a nationwide network of universities and large research institutes. The network operator VusTelecomCentre (Universities Telecommunication Centre) was created for the purposes of RUNNet development and support. Initially, RUNNet was mainly based on satellite technologies.

Towards the end of 1994, the network already had 6 nodes, providing connectivity between Russian and International channels at 64 kbit/s. Local computer networks were created in 68 universities in the country. The universities participating in the project each received 10-20 computers and servers.

The next stage was to ensure connectivity. The best way to achieve this was by using satellites. The Satellite Communication Engineering Center provided the connection by leasing available channels through the Russian Ministry of Defence’s “Raduga” Satellite.

In 1995, satellite nodes were established in Moscow, Saint Petersburg, Ekaterinburg, Novosibirsk, Saratov, Ulianovsk, Nizhni-Novgorod, Rostov-on-Don, Tambov, Tomsk, Krasnoyarsk and Irkutsk. In 1996 Vladivostok, Izhevsk, Perm, Barnaul and Pereslavl-Zalesski were integrated into the satellite infrastructure. Finally in 1997 Khabarovsk, Nalchik, Mahachkala and Stavropol were also added. Bandwidth was limited to 64-128 kbit/s due to the limitations of early satellite technologies. Functioning of this satellite infrastructure was supported by RUNNet’s own teleport in Saint Petersburg. Several Russian satellites have been used; the typical bandwidth for a single university now is 2 Mbit/s, but only a few universities still use the satellite service.

Changes are the result of improvements in terrestrial structures (most of these universities use satellite channels in parallel with terrestrial ones). Terrestrial RUNNet infrastructure was actively developed from 1995 onwards. The first international RUNNet link operating at 256 kbit/s between Saint Petersburg and the Supercomputer Centre in Espoo (Finland) was established with NORDUnet in early 1995. In 1996, it was upgraded to 1 Mbit/s and in 1997 to 2 Mbit/s. Also in 1997, a new international 4 Mbit/s channel was installed between Saint-Petersburg and the New York PoP of Teleglobe. Thus, the aggregate RUNNet international connectivity rose to 6 Mbit/s. 1998 saw a further step in international connectivity with RUNNet.

== RUNNet today ==
There are over 400 universities and other major educational and research institutions using RUNNet today connected either directly to the backbone network of RUNNet or through regional and educational networks. The resources of RUNNet are widely used by other Russian research and education networks such as RBnet, FREEnet, RUHEP/Radio-MSU, RELARN-IP, Moscow network, St. Petersburg State University and Perm National Research Polytechnic University.
