= ITMO University =

University in Saint Petersburg, Russia

- Национальный исследовательский университет ИТМО
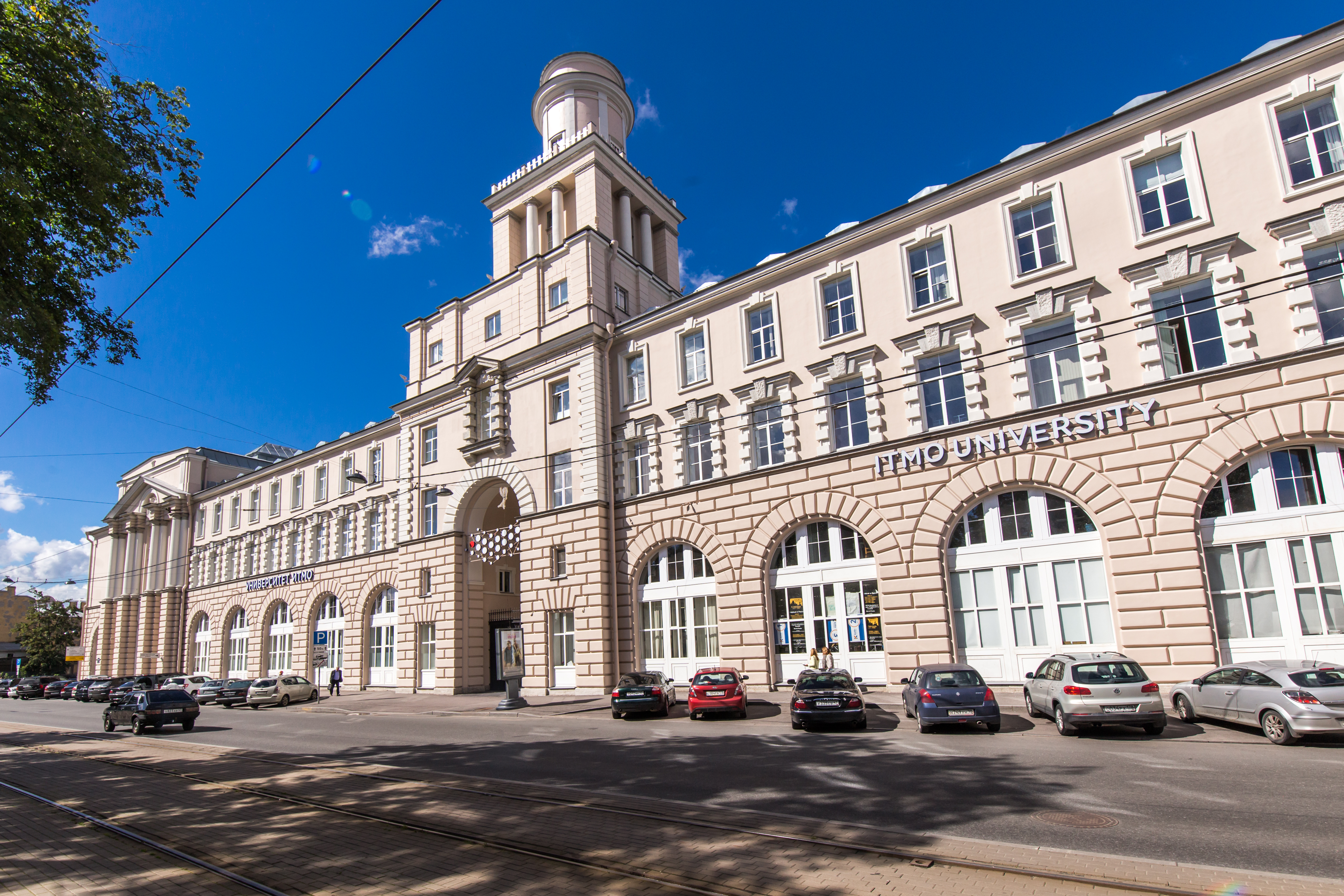
- Former name: See: Names
- Type: Public
- Established: 1900
- Academic affiliations: EUA; IASP
- Rector: Vladimir Vasilyev
- Academic staff: 2,400
- Students: 12,500
- Doctoral students: 900
- Location: Kronverksky Prospekt 49, bldg. A, Petrogradsky District, Saint Petersburg, 197101, Russia; 59.9564°N 30.31°E
- Campus: Urban
- Nickname: Kronverk Snow Leopards
- Sporting affiliations: Association of Student Sports Clubs of Russia
- Mascot: Tim the Snow Leopard (Барс Тим)
- Website: ifmo.ru/en
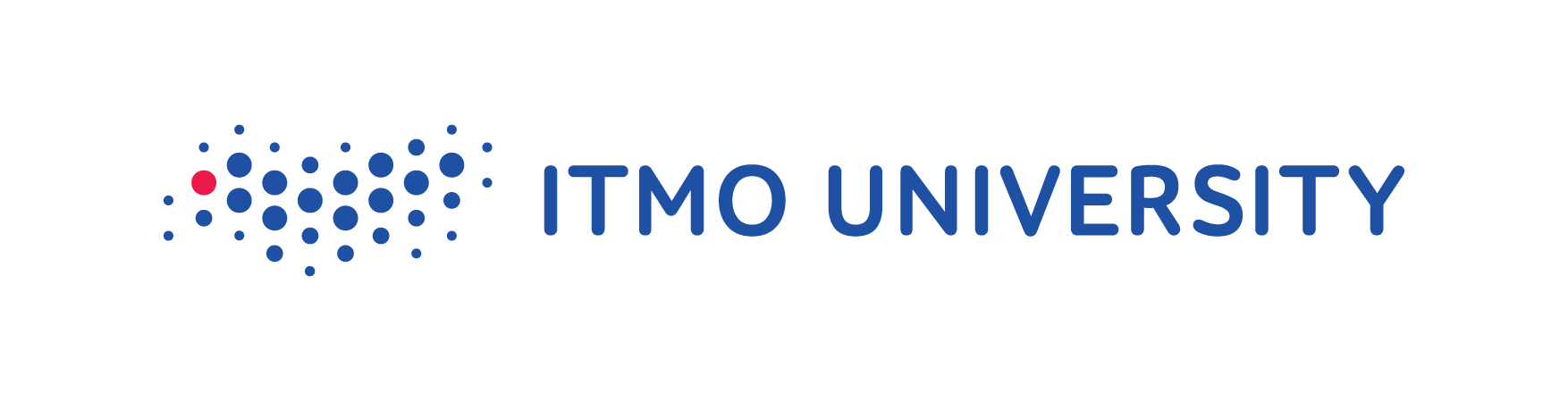

University rankings

Global – Overall
- QS World: 711-720 (2026)

Regional – Overall
- QS Emerging Europe and Central Asia: 27 (2022)

ITMO University (Information Technologies, Mechanics and Optics University; Russian: Университет ИТМО) is a state-supported university in Saint Petersburg and is one of Russia's National Research Universities. ITMO University is one of 15 Russian universities that were selected to participate in Russian Academic Excellence Project 5-100 by the government of the Russian Federation to improve their international standing among the world's research and educational centers.

Research priorities of ITMO University are concentrated in information and photonic technologies. The university consists of four main schools, 14 faculties, and a number of institutes and research centers. As of 2020, the total number of students was over 12,500, with 2,450 being foreign nationals. In 2014, the university employed 1,163 instructors, including over 800 PhDs. Many of its staff members and researchers have received government awards and designations of "honored science worker," the highest in Russia. Vladimir Vasilyev has been the university's Rector since 1996.

== History ==
The university's birthday is considered to be 26 March 1900, when a Mechanics, Optics and Watchmaking Department was opened in the Prince Nicholas Vocational School. At the time it was the only school in the Russian Empire that prepared specialists in these areas. The first year, some 65 applications were received for 30 places. Eighteen students were admitted to Watchmaking and 18 to Mechanics and Optics sections.

=== 1917–1941 ===
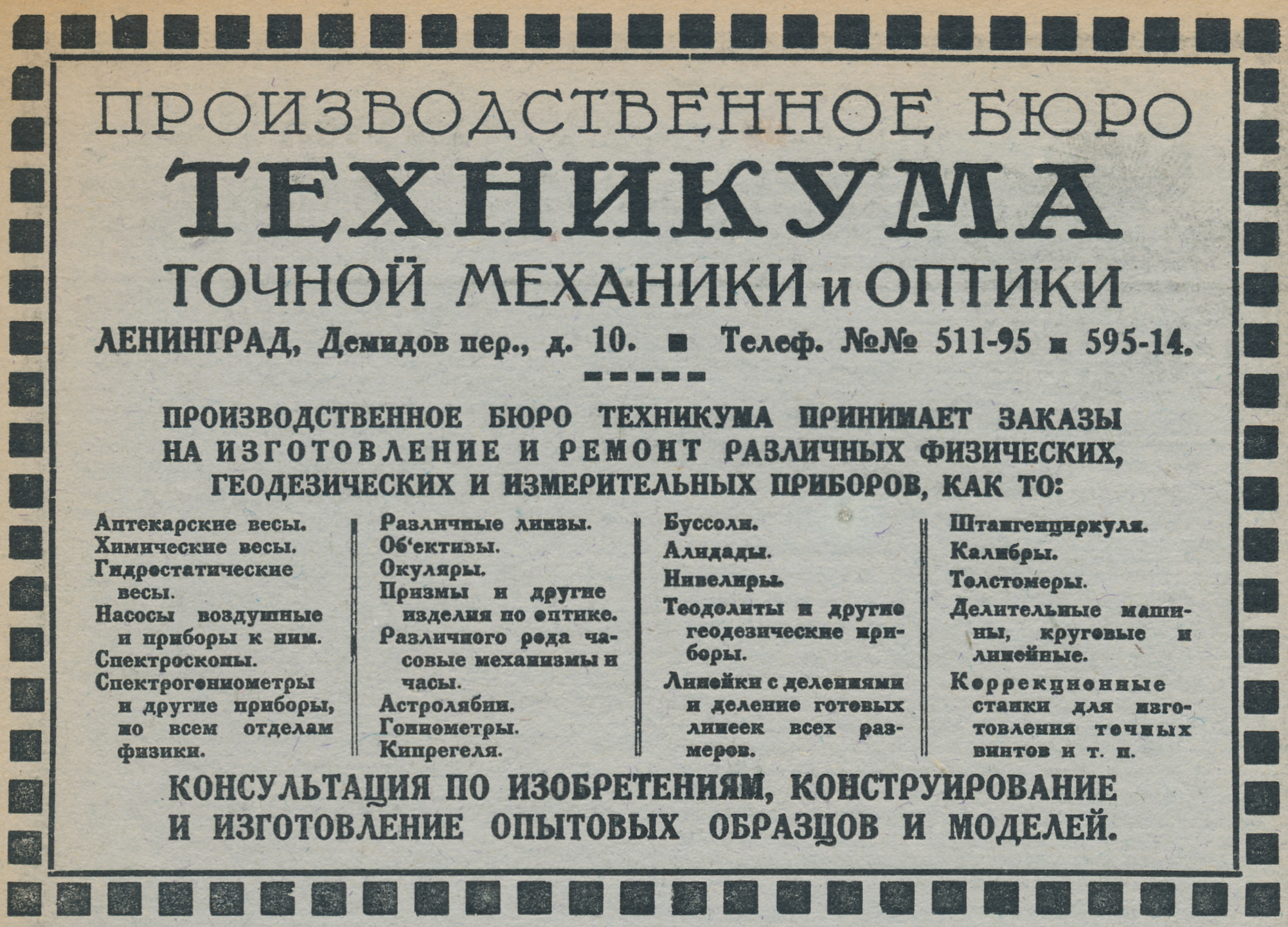
An advertisement for the Technical College's production bureau, 1927

In 1917 the Mechanics, Optics and Watchmaking Department became its own entity–Petrograd Technical College for Mechanics, Optics and Watchmaking. Norbert Boleslavovich Zavodsky became its headmaster. In 1920, most of its classes were transformed into Petrograd College for Fine Mechanics and Optics (later–Leningrad). The municipalities allocated a building for it in Demidov Pereulok (Pereulok Grivtzova). The colleges' manufacturing facilities made a variety of complex optical and fine mechanics products. The first in USSR group of instrument engineers graduated here in 1931.

In 1930, the college was transformed into Leningrad Training Center, and in 1933, Leningrad Institute of Fine Mechanics and Optics (LIFMO) became a separate college. Its first research laboratory was established in the Department of Optical Glass Technologies. Thanks to research here the USSR could get away from importing expensive foreign abrasives.

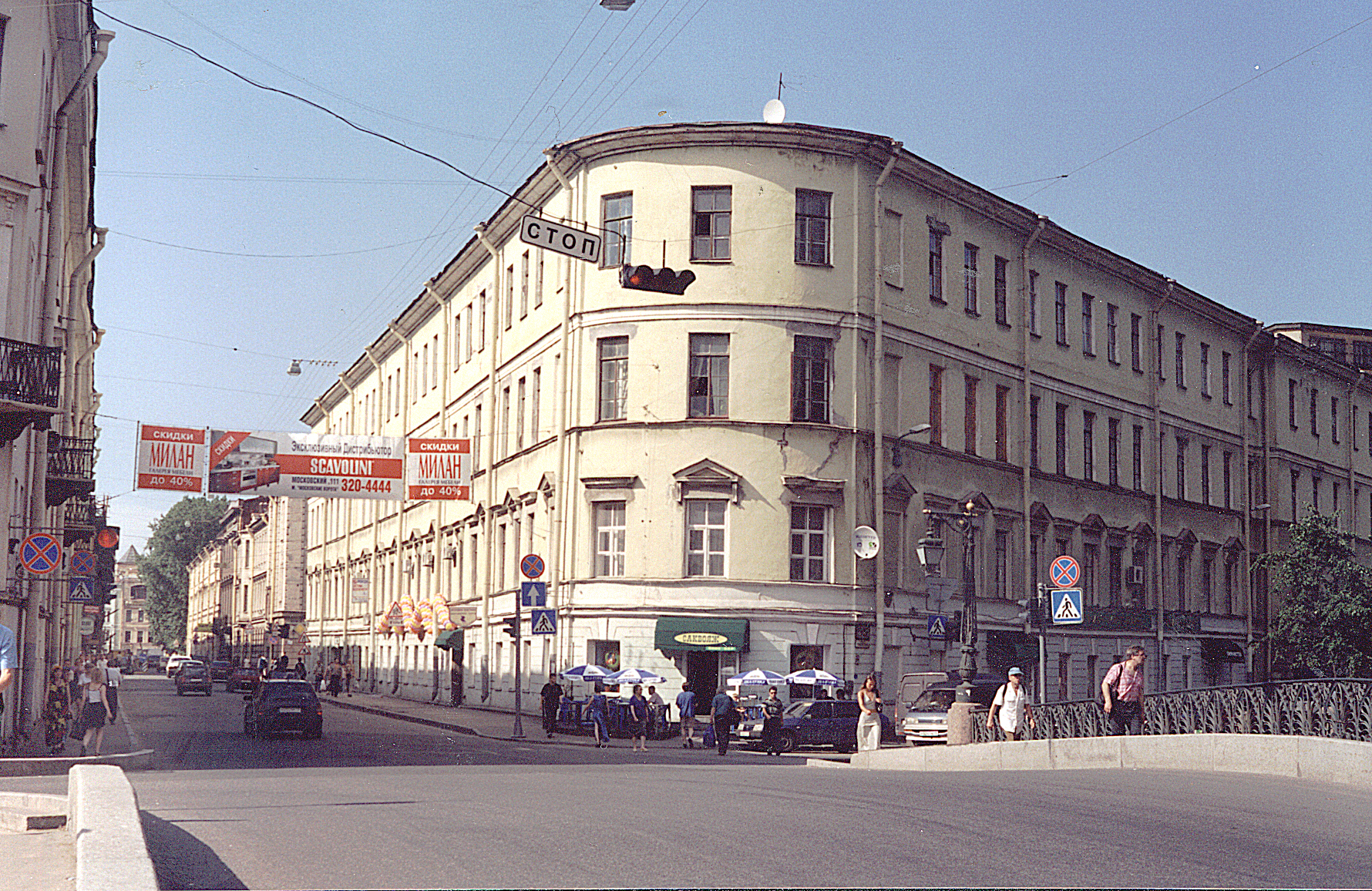
LITMO's first main building on Demidov Pereulok (Grivtsova Pereulok), 14–16, 2006

In 1937, LITMO opened the first in the USSR laboratory for calculating machinery that was later transformed into the Department of Mathematical and Computing Devices. By the autumn of 1939 it became one of the institute's top departments and focused on developing electromechanical computing devices and control devices. By 1940, it had over 1,400 students and employed 27 professors as well as 80 associated professors and PhDs.

=== 1941–1945 ===
With the beginning of the Second World War, 189 students and 85 staff members went to the front lines, while over 450 joined the People's Militia. Classes continued and only at the end of 1942 the students and instructors were evacuated to the town of Cherapanovo by Novosibirsk.

During the Siege of Leningrad, LIFMO continued to operate a military repair facility for the Leningrad front. It fabricated test and measurement instruments for army and navy units. During the Siege, the facility developed improved optical sights, fixed artillery binoculars, gun panoramas, anti-aircraft sighting telescopes, periscopes, machined "cups" for anti-aircraft shells and parts for land and sea mines.

After the Siege was lifted, the re-evacuation document was signed on August 10, 1944. The students and instructors returned to the city, and classes started again that October.

=== 1945–1992 ===
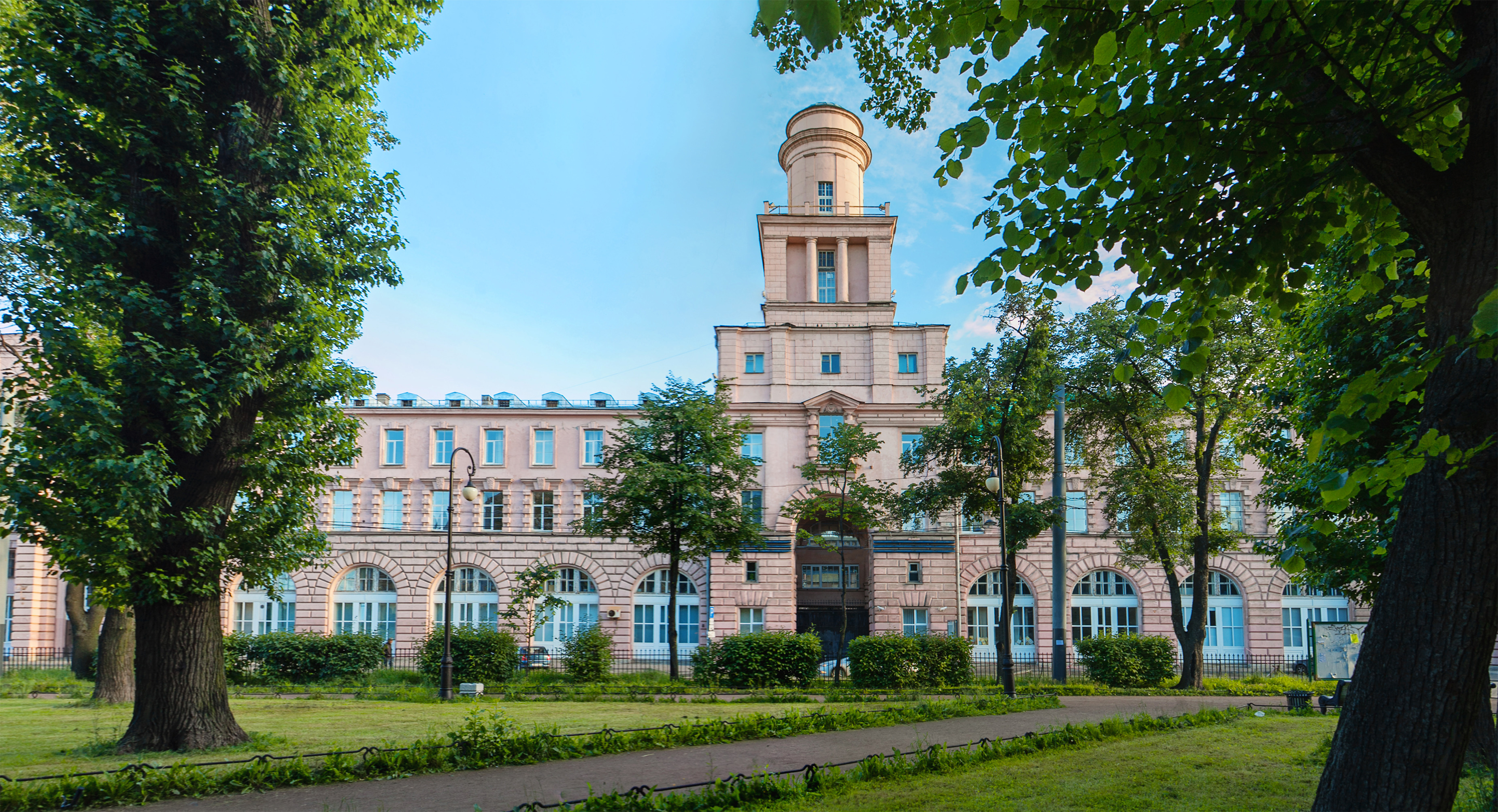
ITMO University's main building at Kronverksky Prospekt 49, 2015

The university began to actively develop after the war. In the fall of 1945 it opened a new faculty–Electrical Instrumentation, which was soon reorganized into Radio Engineering. Here was established Department of Quantum Radio Electronics, which began to train specialists in this field. Engineering Physics Department was established here in 1946. From this department in 1954 graduated Dr. Yuri Denisjuk, a future scientist, author of discoveries in holography, and laureate of the state award.

In 1956, the researchers of the Computing Devices Department began to work on the first calculating machine "LITMO-1" that was finished in 1958. It did binary engineering calculations but the data was entered and the results were presented in the familiar decimal system. A laboratory for laser technologies was opened in the 1960s. The building on Sablinskaya Street, which is now the main campus, was built in the 1970s. The following decade saw the beginning of microprocessor technology research and the opening of the Interdisciplinary Institute of Advanced Studies to train manufacturing professionals in new areas of engineering and technology.

=== 1992–present ===
In 1992, LIFMO became Saint Petersburg Institute of Fine Mechanics and Optics, and in 1994 it acquired the university status. The Faculty of Computer Technologies and Controls opened in 1994.

In 1994 the institute was the initiator and key developer of RUNNET, an IP network that unites all large research and education centers in Russia. The work was overseen by Dr. Vasilyev. The institute placed satellite dishes "Russia's Rainbow," rented from the military, on other universities. In 1995, the research center "Computer Optics" was established. In 2003 the institute was renamed into Saint Petersburg State University of Information Technologies, Mechanics and Optics.

Academy of Management Methods and Technologies (LIMTU) was added to the ITMO structure as well as Interdisciplinary Institute of Professional Training in New Areas of Science and Technology and the State Scientific Center of Computer Telecommunication Networks of Higher Education, followed by St. Petersburg College of Marine Instrument Making, St. Petersburg State University of Refrigeration and Biotechnology and St. Petersburg Economic and Technological College of D.I. Mendeleev.

In 2009 the university gained the status of National Research University and was renamed National Research University ITMO in 2011. In 2013 it was selected to join the Project 5–100.

From January 9, 2013, to November 3, 2014, a tribute to Steve Jobs in a form of a giant iPhone graced the courtyard of the university's building on Birzhevaya Linija.

On November 26, 2014, the university opened its representative office in Brussels.

Since 2014, the university holds the name of ITMO University.

=== Names ===
- 1900–1917: Mechanics, Optics and Watchmaking Department of the Prince Nicholas Vocational School
- 1917–1920: Petrograd Technical College for Mechanics, Optics and Watchmaking.
- 1920–1930: Petrograd College for Fine Mechanics and Optics
- 1930–1992: Leningrad Institute of Fine Mechanics and Optics
- 1992–1994: Saint Petersburg Institute of Fine Mechanics and Optics
- 1994–2003: Saint Petersburg University of Fine Mechanics and Optics
- 2003–2011: Saint Petersburg State University of Information Technologies, Mechanics and Optics
- 2011–2014: National Research University ITMO
- Since 2014: ITMO University

== Present ==
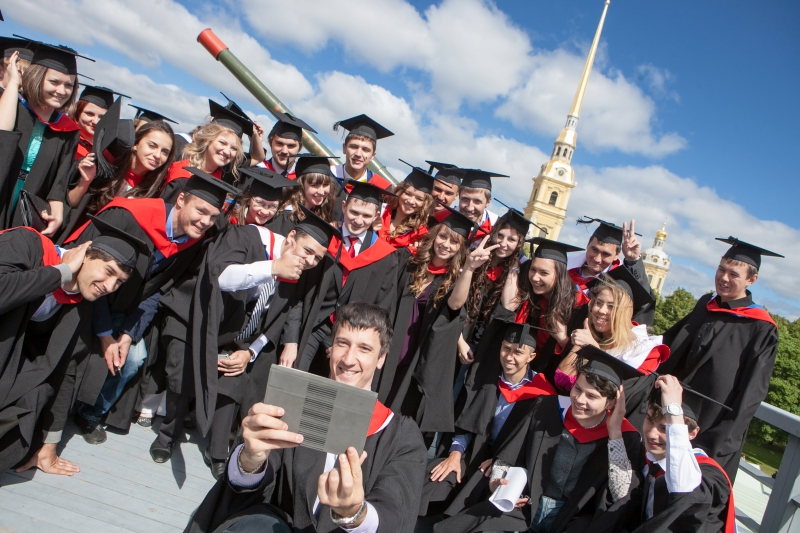
Graduates on the bastion of the Peter and Paul Fortress, 2014

The university has a multi-level system of higher education: bachelor–4 years, specialist–5 years, master–2 years, post-graduate–3–4 years.

Since 2013/14 ITMO is partnering with universities in Germany, the Netherlands, Poland, Finland, France, among others, to participate in "double degree" international educational programs. ITMO graduates of these programs receive a second degree from a partner university.

The university collaborates with large St. Petersburg companies, including Elektropribor, LOMO, Mendeleev Institute for Metrology. The university supports a variety of scholarships: President of the Russian Federation, The Government of the Russian Federation, the Government of St. Petersburg, special scholarships in math, physics, IT, Research Council scholarship, name scholarship by LOMO and other companies. Students and staff carry out research and project activities on their own and as part of programs funded by the state and international contracts, federal and industry targeted programs. The university organizes and hosts competitions, congresses (for example, the annual "Young Scientists Congress"), forums, research conferences, including international ("Sensorica," "Fundamental Problems of Optics," etc.). In 2013, the university was one of the venues for the Russian National Student Forum.

The university has participated in student and instructor exchange programs financed by organizations, including the DAAD. ITMO is a member of the Association of European Universities. It also collaborates with foreign universities, including UCLA and ITESM.

ITMO University is one of two St. Petersburg universities–members of the Shanghai Cooperation Organisation. SCO University offers involved learning where students work based on individual plans, learn about life in a different country and thus add to their education at their "home" university. At graduation, SCO University students receive a regular diploma and a special certificate.

The university is part of the Association of Technical Universities of Russia and China, founded in 2011, and participates in joint educational programs with the leading universities in China. This non-commercial organization unites technical universities of both countries and facilities student and instructor exchange. It was originally established at Harbin Institute of Technology and Bauman Technical University in Moscow.

Several times ITMO University students won "Yandex. Algorithm" programming championship, organized by one of Russia's internet companies. It's not a student competition per se but open to participants over 17. In 2013, it welcomed over 3,000 programmers from 84 countries and several large companies, including Google, Facebook and Vkontakte. That same year ITMO students took gold and silver, and in 2014–gold again, followed by another gold in 2015.

ITMO team also regularly participates in ACM ICPC programming championship under the general sponsorship by IBM since 1997. In 2013, the university hosted the 37th championship and its student won the top prize. ITMO students received medals in this championship since 1999 and from 2004 till 2015 became absolute winners six times. In 2013, after their fifth win, Russia's Ministry of Defense signed a contract with ITMO University to develop software for unmanned airplanes and robotics, to name a few. The same year Minister Sergey Shoygu offered talented students jobs in scientific military units as an alternative to mandatory military service.

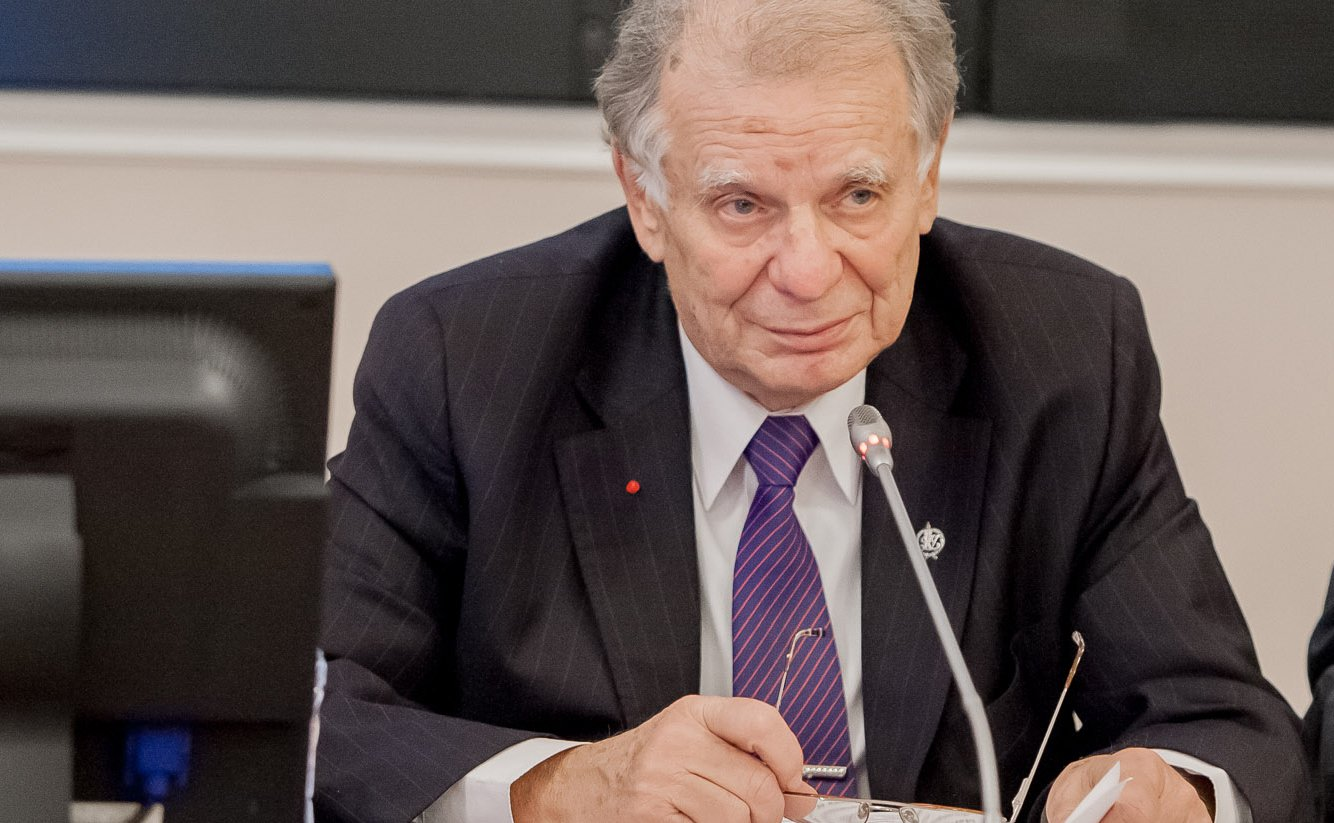
Zhores Alfyorov

ITMO University maintains ties with IT companies. In 2011, Dmitry Grishin, the general director of Mail.Ru, became the head of the department of internet technologies founded by the company. Later it was reorganized. In 2012, Russian programmers working for Facebook held a series of lectures at the leading technical universities in Russia, including ITMO. In 2015, Nobel Prize winner Zhores Alferov opened the International Year of Light and Light-based Technologies in St. Petersburg and held an open lecture at the university.

In November 2014, the association of software manufacturers Russoft published a ranking of Russian universities by the level of success in training of the IT specialists. ITMO University placed first. Around the same time the university held a conference together with the association about the advantages of successful performance at international programming competitions.

In 2015, the Ministry of Education offered several universities, including ITMO to participate in the "National Platform for Open Education" Association and develop a pilot for online education with an opportunity to graduate at the completion of the courses. Currently this project still requires changes when it comes to licenses and university accreditations. Every participating university has to present no fewer than four online courses by September 2015.

Russian President Vladimir Putin congratulated the team of ITMO University with its sixth victory in ACM ICPC programming championship at the plenary session during the second day of the St. Petersburg International Economic Forum in May 2015.

=== Rankings ===
In 2022, the university was ranked #365 in the world by QS World University Rankings, and #601 by World University Rankings by Times Higher Education. In 2021, it was ranked #718 in the world by Best Global Universities Rankings by U.S. News & World Report, and #901 by Academic Ranking of World Universities by Shanghai Jiao Tong University.

ITMO University is one of the 21 Russian institutions of higher education that were selected for participation in the Russian Academic Excellence Project 5-100, launched in 2013 by the Russian Ministry of Education and Science. The aim of the project is to have at least five Russian universities included in the top-100 lists of three major international university rankings: the Academic Ranking of World Universities, QS World University Rankings, and THE World University Rankings, compiled annually by the ranking agencies ShanghaiRanking Consultancy, Quacquarelli Symonds, and the Times Higher Education magazine, respectively. Universities participating in the project regularly compile development roadmaps in which they outline their goals in regard to enhancing their position in international rankings. The project's council reviews these roadmaps and consults the Ministry of Science and Higher Education, which in turn distributes funding among the participating universities. ITMO University has been one of the project's top participants; these universities receive subsidies of up to 1 billion rubles.

In September 2016, ITMO University made its debut in THE World University Rankings within the 350-400 range, and was ranked 56th in computer science (but it dropped to the 101-125 range in 2020 in computer science), but it dropped to #601 in the world ranking in 2022. In June 2017, ITMO debuted in the QS World University Rankings within the 601-650 range, but it was ranked #901 in the world in 2022. ITMO made its debut in the ARWU in August 2018 within the 801-900 range. As of the start of 2020, ITMO University featured in 13 subject rankings published by THE, QS, and ARWU.

The university is also included in a number of other Russian and international rankings compiled by various analytics agencies, companies, and magazines. Since 2018, the Russian edition of the Forbes magazine has been publishing its ranking of the top 100 Russian institutions of higher education, in which ITMO University has consistently been placing among the top ten.

Ranking / Year of publication	2011	2012	2013	2014	2015	2016	2017	2018	2019	2020
Times Higher Education: World						351-400	501-600	501-600	401-500	501-600
Times Higher Education: Computer Science						56	76	71	74	101-125
Times Higher Education: Engineering & Technology							301-400	301-400	201-250	251-300
Times Higher Education: Physical Sciences							401-500	301-400	251-300	251-300
Times Higher Education: Business and Economics										201-250
Times Higher Education: Life Sciences										301-400
Times Higher Education: Emerging Economies (before 2018, BRICS & EECA)						27 (ranking for 2017)	27 (ranking for 2017, published in 2016)	57	53	35
QS World University Ranking							601-650	511-520	436	360
QS: Computer Science & Information Systems							351-400	251-300	101-150	101-150
QS: Engineering–Electrical & Electronic								351-400	201-250	201-250
QS: Physics & Astronomy							351-400	351-400	251-300	201-250
QS: Materials Science									301-350	251-300
QS: Mechanical, Aeronautical & Manufacturing Engineering									351-400	301-350
QS: Mathematics										351-400
QS: Chemistry										451-500
QS: Art & Design									151-200	
QS University Ranking: EECA				91-100	90	81	66	56	46	36
QS University Ranking: BRICS				111-120	99	101-110	75	64	no longer published	
Academic Ranking of World Universities (ARWU)								801-900	801-900	901-1000
ARWU: Automation & Control									76-100	76-100
ARWU: Nanoscience & Nanotechnology								201–300	201–300	201-300
ARWU: Materials Science & Engineering								301-400	301-400	401-500
ARWU: Electrical & Electronic Engineering								401-500	301-400	301-400
ARWU: Computer Science & Engineering										401–500
ARWU: Management										301–400
ARWU: Telecommunication Engineering										151–200
U.S. News Best Global Universities: World							941	816	752	718
U.S. News Best Global Universities: Physics							422	391	337	311
U.S. News Best Global Universities: Engineering								518	399	301
U.S. News Best Global Universities: Electrical and Electronic Engineering									215	139
U.S. News Best Global Universities: Materials Science									300	289
U.S. News Best Global Universities: Chemistry									606	534
U.S. News Best Global Universities: Computer Science										350
U.S. News Best Global Universities: Nanoscience and Nanotechnology										164
Webometrics: World				1399/985 (Jan./Jul.)	1049/1019 (Jan./Jul.)	996/864 (Jan./Jul.)	836/831 (Jan./Jul.)	783/1367 (Jan./Jul.)	652/692 (Jan./Jul.)	723/969 (Jan./Jul.)
Webometrics: BRICS				139(Jul.)	166/135 (Jan./Jul.)	100/97 (Jan./Jul.)	61/118 (Jan./Jul.)	100/221 (Jan./Jul.)	83/90 (Jan./Jul.)	98/147 (Jan./Jul.)
Webometrics: Russia				13/8 (Jan./Jul.)	9/6 (Jan./Jul.)	7/6 (Jan./Jul.)	6/6 (Jan./Jul.)	6/11 (Jan./Jul.)	4/5 (Jan./Jul.)	6/13 (Jan./Jul.)
Round University Ranking: World					587	485	475	495	445	360
Round University Ranking: Technical Sciences					340	287	190	159	168	92
Round University Ranking: Natural Sciences					413	346	382	432	393	413
Round University Ranking: Life Sciences						538	394	299	427	413
Round University Ranking: Social Sciences							371	292	399	469
Round University Ranking: Humanities								442	258	513
Round University Ranking: Countries Ranking (Russia)					14	8	9	10	9	6
Three University Missions Moscow International University Ranking								245	243	219
Interfax: Russia	27-29	18-22	17	17	15	12	7	9	9-10	11
RAEX (before 2015, Expert Ranking Agency)		23	23	22	22	19	19	15	14	13

== Structure, university institutes and departments ==
- Institute of Design & Urban Studies
- Institute of Translational Medicine

- Department of Higher Qualification Expert Training
- Department of Computer Technologies and Control Systems
  - Department of Control Systems and Industrial Robotics
  - Department of Software Engineering and Computer Systems
  - Department of Information Security and Computer Technologies
- Information Technologies and Programming Department
- Department of Infocommunication Technologies
- Department of Photonics and Optical Information
- Department of Laser and Light Engineering
- Department of Technological Management and Innovations
- Institute of International Development and Partnership
- Department of Cryogenic Techniques and Air Conditioning
- Department of Food Biotechnologies and Engineering
- Department of International Business and Law
- Department of Management and Automation Controls
- Department of Natural Sciences
- Department of Integrated Military Education
- Department of Distance Education
- Department of Secondary Vocational Education
- Department of Career Development and Pre-Entry Preparatory Training
- Department of Advanced Training of Teachers

== Leadership ==
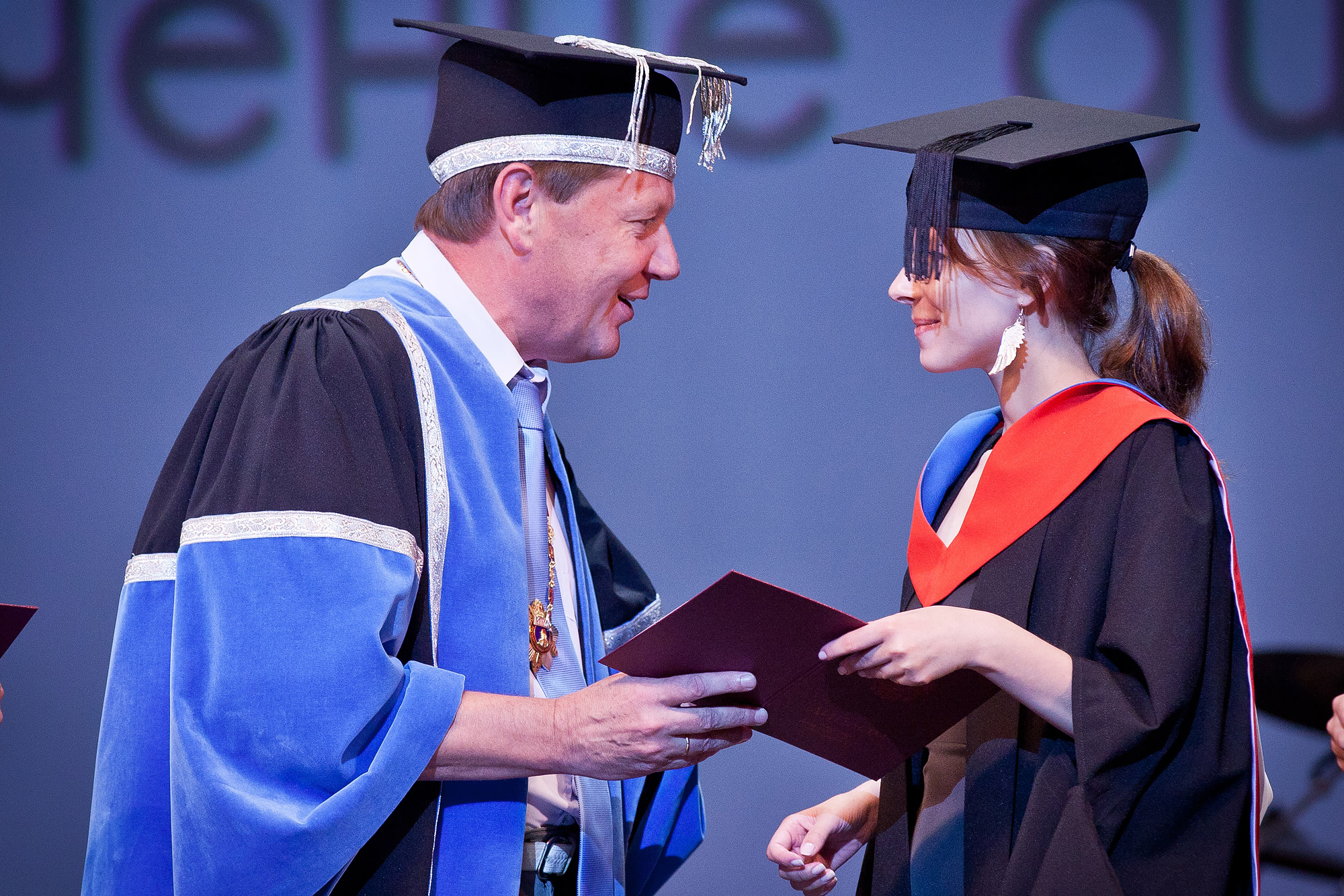
Rector Vladimir Vasilyev presents diplomas to students, 2013

Since 1996, the Rector of the university is the Honored Scientist of the Russian Federation, Chairman of the Council of Rectors of St. Petersburg (2004), vice-president of the Russian Union of Rectors (2006), corresponding member of the Russian Academy of Education, corresponding member Russian Academy of Sciences, Doctor of Technical Sciences, Professor Vladimir Vasilyev.

== Research and partnerships ==
ITMO University collaborates on research and innovations projects with several large Russian companies, including LOMO, D.I. Mendeleyev Institute for Metrology (VNIIM), Techpribor, Elektropribor, etc. The university signed an agreement to create the Northwestern Center for Technology Transfer to become one of 12 nano-centers around Russia. Originally it was supposed to be in the town of Gatchina. In 2015 it was opened in St. Petersburg on Malookhtenskii Prospect. Another joint project with Rusnano is "Innograd of Science and Technologies." It was expected to open by 2019 in the satellite city Yuzhny. Rusnano was investing 690 million rubles in its equipment. Construction was scheduled to begin in 2015 in the town of Pushkin, near St. Petersburg.

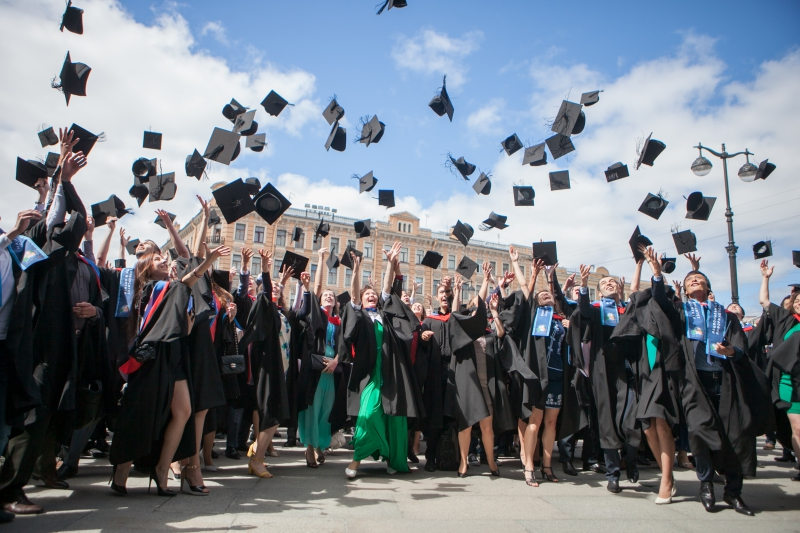
Graduation ceremony for Master's and Specialist's students, 2013

In 2012, a "Skolkovo" communications center was supposed to open on the campus of the former Institute of Refrigeration and Biotechnologies of ITMO, but the plans were altered. That same year the university signed a memorandum with RSV Venture Partners Foundation to establish a $6 million fund for IT startups. In 2013, Internet Initiatives Development Fund offered ITMO University to collaborate in opening regional accelerators to support commercially promising internet startups.

University's list of international partners over the years includes General Motors Corp., PPG, Samsung Electro-Mechanics, Nokia and others.

Students and staff members of over 80 departments participate in research. Many of them are working in "small innovative enterprises," or startups, located at ITMO Technopark on Birzhevaya Liniya, offering access to high-tech equipment.

As part of the Project 5–100, Technopark opened a coworking space called FabLab in 2015, which also offered facilities and resources, including a 3D printer, a laser engraver, a milling machine, etc. The equipment is offered free of charge to the ITMO University specialists and students.

=== National Research University Program ===
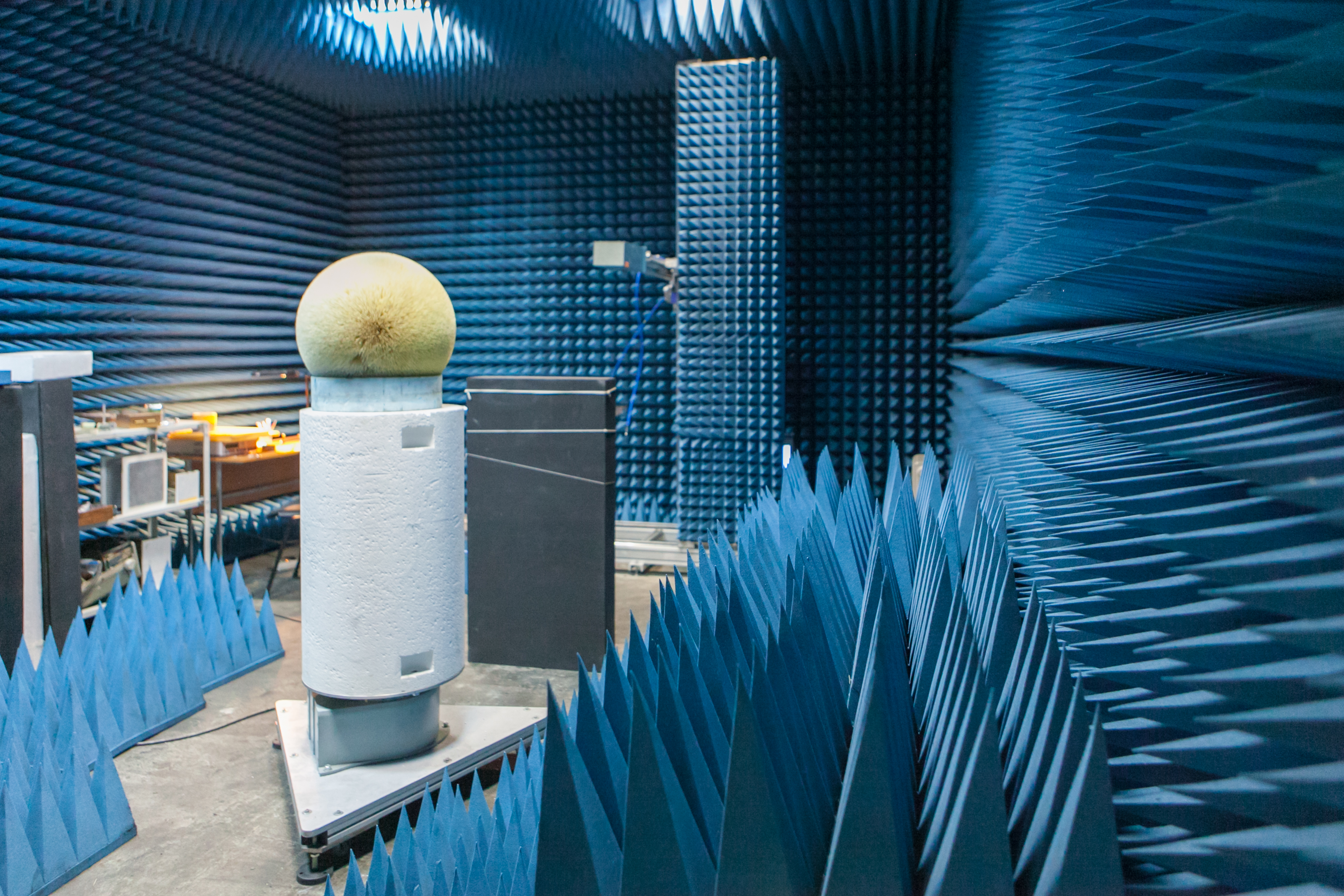
The anechoic chamber of the Metamaterials Lab, 2015

In 2009, the university was granted the status of National Research University. It implies carrying out research in areas considered key to the development of Russia's economy, including IT, photonics, optoinformatics, and urban science.

=== International research centers ===
As part of the Project 5–100, the university created international research centers to carry out joint research between scientists at ITMO and their peers at foreign research and education centers. By 2014 the university had established 49 such entities with co-heads from the United States, United Kingdom, Germany, Australia, China, etc.

In order to strengthen governmental support for the development of science and innovations in higher education and to improve the quality of higher education, on April 9, 2010, the Government of the Russian Federation instituted monetary grants that were made available on a competitive basis to support of scientific research projects implemented by the world's scientists at Russian institutions of higher learning. From some 507 applications, 39 were awarded funding, including two from ITMO University. In 2013 ITMO University won two more mega-grants from the Ministry of Education and Science of Russia Federation.

Year	Country	Leading scientist	Field of science	Research field
2010	Australia	Prof. Yuri S. Kivshar	Physics	Metamaterials
2010	Netherlands	Prof. Peter Sloot	Information Technologies and Computational Science	Promising Computational Science
2013	France	Prof. Romeo Ortega	Computational and Information Sciences	Robust and adaptive control system, communication and computing
2013	Ireland	Prof Yurii Gun'ko	Nanotechnologies	Anisotropic and optically active nanostrucutres
2016	United States	Prof. Anvar Zakhidov	Nanotechnologies, Metamaterials	Organic-inorganic materials with integrated nanophotonic structures
2016	United Kingdom	Prof. Morris Skolnick	Quantum Mechanics	Hybrid light-matter states in low-dimensional quantum materials

=== Small innovative enterprises (start-ups) ===
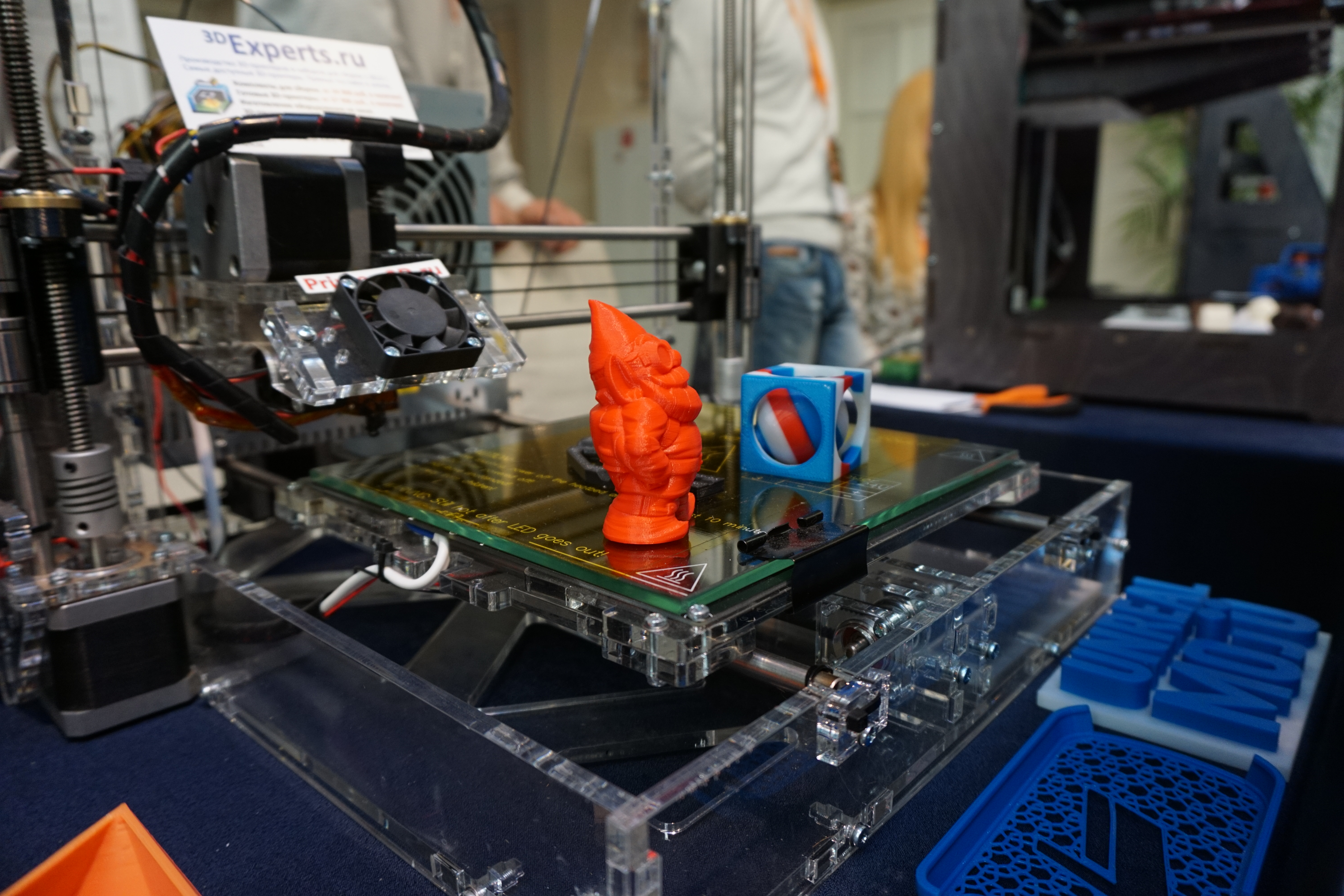
A 3D printer at ITMO University

Since 15 August 2009 Russian universities are able to form small innovative enterprises according to Federal Law No.217 of August 2, 2009 N 217-FZ "On Amendments to Certain Legislative Acts of the Russian Federation on the establishment of budget scientific and educational institutions, business entities for the purpose of practical application (implementation) of the results of intellectual activity".

By 2015 ITMO University has become the Launchpad for 43 small innovative enterprises. A special department is designated to helping them find funding, offers legal support for registering, partner search, placement in university's Technopark and business incubator. Other types of support include education initiatives: classes in social entrepreneurship and projects, fundraising school FundIT, soft skill training, lectures in marketing and management, interdisciplinary seminars Brainexplain, as well as lectures by guest experts.

The university holds an annual international forum where its partners and business stakeholders discuss issues in technology transfer and development of innovations ecosystem. Other events are festival of social entrepreneurship, a competition of socially valuable projects "People need you!", and a business game "Innovations marketing"».

ITMO University was as of 2015 developing a network of startup accelerators in Russia's regions as part of the program for development of research and entrepreneurship potential of Russian universities "EURECA" and in partnership with the U.S. Russia Foundation and University of California, Los Angeles (UCLA). To promote building an innovation ecosystem from the ground up, ITMO partnered with "Xmas Ventures" and St. Petersburg Polytechnic University to establish a Demola Innovations Center in St. Petersburg, the only one in Russia.

German company SAP SE was instrumental in supporting the university's startups. What started with joint business incubator events and accelerator programs in 2013 grew into a partnership.

=== Accelerators ===
In spring of 2015, ITMO University launched the Future Technologies accelerator for startups in instrumentation, robotics, optics and photonics, biotechnologies and energy efficiency. In the future, the organizers hoped to attract companies working in new materials and alternative energy. The participants receive a three-month training course as well as free office space, supplies and consultations with experts in research and business. They can apply for a 300,000 ruble grant that covers expenses for research and development. In the first session, 10 companies were selected to participate out of 70 that applied. At the end of June, the startups presented their projects at the international conference Russia-EU Startup Match-making Event in Brussels.

SumIT startup accelerator takes place at the university every six months since 2012. The top ten teams from the previous sessions from Russia, Finland, France and USA secured funding from $20,000 to $200,000 and several settled in the startup accelerator iDealMachine.

=== World Programming Championship ===
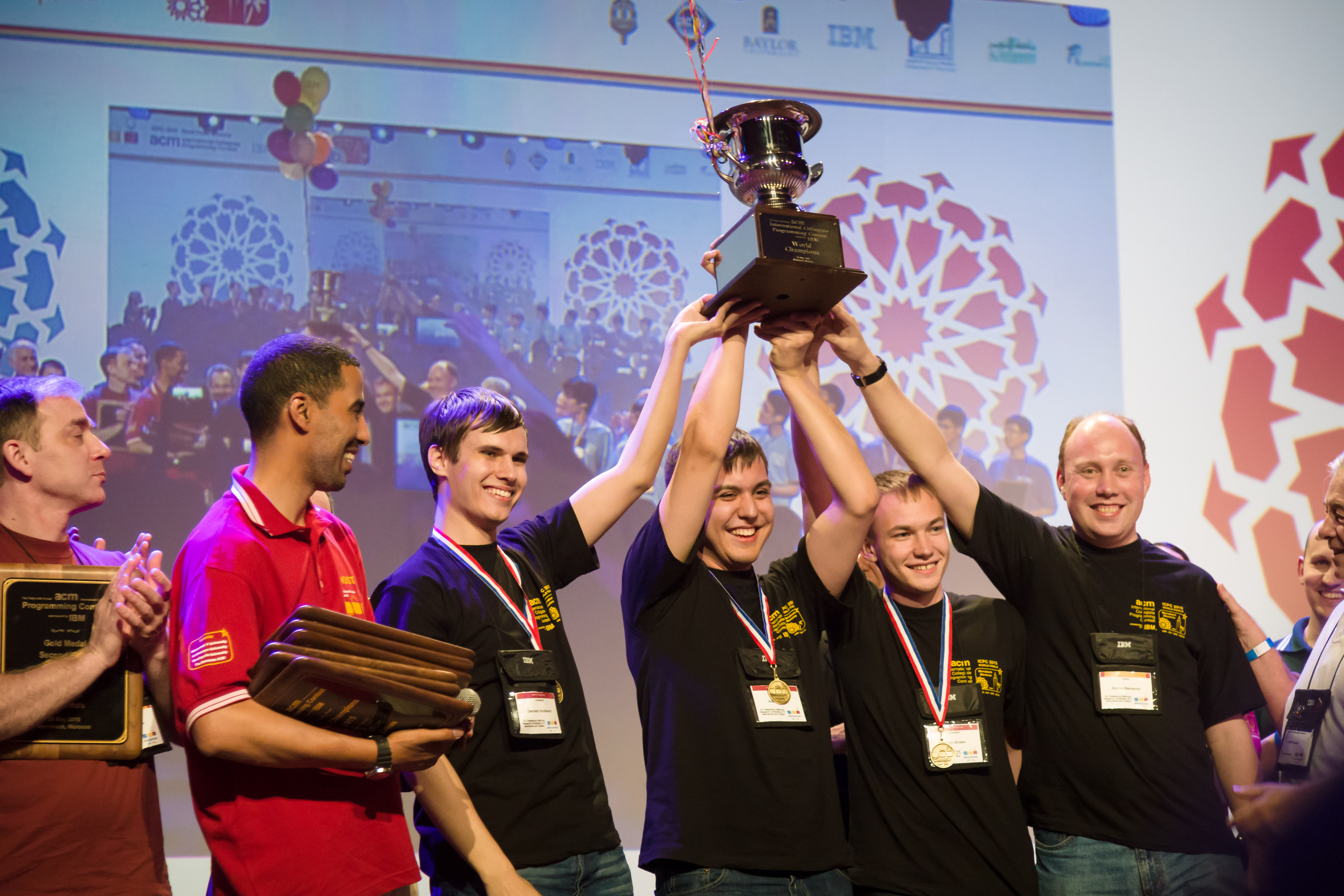
ITMO University students become six-time world champions in collegiate programming, 2015

In 2004, ITMO University scored its first victory in the International Collegiate Programming Contest ACM-ICPC, and by 2017 it became the first in history seven-time winner of the competition.

In 2013, ITMO University was the first Russian university to host the ACM-ICPC Finals. Some 120 teams representing 2,322 universities from 36 countries participated in selection rounds. Russia was represented by 15 student teams. ITMO University scored a victory in the finals.

Year	Venue of the finals	Venue	Team	Trainer
2019	Porto, Portugal	17th place	Stanislav Naumov, Roman Korobkov, Ilya Poduremennykh	Andrey Stankevich
2018	Beijing, China	9th place, Bronze medal	Ilya Zban, Ivan Belonogov, Mikhail Putilin	Andrey Stankevich
2017	Rapid City, South Dakota, U.S.	1st place, Gold medal	Vladimir Smykalov, Ivan Belonogov, Ilya Zban	Andrey Stankevich
2016	Phuket, Thailand	7th place, Silver medal	Anton Kovsharov, Vladimir Smykalov, Adam Bardashevich	Andrey Stankevich
2015	Marrakesh, Morocco	1st place, Gold medal	Gennady Korotkevich, Boris Minaev, Artem Vasil'ev	Andrey Stankevich
2014	Yekaterinburg, Russia	9th place, Bronze medal	Boris Minaev, Artem Vasil'ev, Adam Bardashevich	Andrey Stankevich
2013	St. Petersburg, Russia	1st place, Gold medal	Mihail Kever, Gennady Korotkevich, Niyaz Nigmatullin	Andrey Stankevich
2012	Warsaw, Poland	1st place, Gold medal	Evgenii Kapun, Mihail Kever, Niyaz Nigmatullin	Andrey Stankevich
2009	Stockholm, Sweden	1st place, Gold medal	Vladislav Isenbaev, Maksim Buzdalov, Evgenii Kapun	Andrey Stankevich
2008	Banff, Canada	1st place, Gold medal	Dmitrii Abdrashitov, Dmitrii Paraschenko, Fedor Tsarev	Andrey Stankevich
2007	Tokyo, Japan	3rd place, Gold medal	Iskander Akishev, Mikhail Dvorkin, Roman Satyukov	
2005	Shanghai, China	3rd place, Gold medal	Pavel Mavrin, Sergei Orshanskii, Dmitrii Pavlov	Andrey Stankevich
2004	Prague, Czech Republic	1st place, Gold medal	Dmitrii Pavlov, Pavel Mavrin, Sergei Orshanskii	Andrey Stankevich
2003	Beverly Hills, California, U.S.	3rd place, Gold medal	Timofei Borodin, Aleksandr Shtuchkin, Evgenii Yujakov	
2001	Vancouver, Canada	3rd place, Gold medal	Georgii Korneev, Denis Kuznecov, Andrey Stankevich	
2000	Orlando, Florida, U.S.	Silver medal	Georgii Korneev, Denis Kuznecov, Andrey Stankevich	
1999	Eindhoven, Netherlands	3rd place, Gold medal	Aleksandr Volkov, Matvei Kazakov, Vladimir Levkin	

== ITMO Highpark ==
In 2017, the university initiated the ITMO Highpark project, which entails the creation of a research, education, and innovation center with the university's second campus as its core. The future campus will be situated in the south of St. Petersburg, in the vicinity of Pulkovo Airport. The university administration's proposal was supported by the Governor of St. Petersburg and the Russian Government. On October 13, 2017, the Prime Minister Dmitry Medvedev signed the corresponding executive order; on October 17, he made an official announcement of the project's launch at the Open Innovations forum.

ITMO University's second campus, along with a Techno Valley and a Business Park, will be situated on an area of 87 hectares. The second campus, which will include an academic building, three research centers, a student club, a sports facility, dormitories, and a science museum, will cover an area of 41 hectares, with the total area of all interior spaces being approximately 100,000 sq.m. The campus will be home to ITMO's Master's and doctoral programs that are focused on applied research and its commercialization. The university's buildings in central St. Petersburg will remain in use by Bachelor's programs and Master's programs focused on fundamental science.

The Techno Valley is described as "a site for objects of scientific, innovative, and production infrastructure established by businesses and startups". Its total area will equal 16 hectares. In the future, it is planned to become an Innovative Research and Technology Center (IRTC), which will offer tax concessions to businesses. The Business Park will be the site of a National Center for Urban Studies, a Data Processing Center, a business incubator, and various other objects of business and cultural infrastructure. The total area allocated for the Business Park is 4 hectares.

By 2024, 3,600 students are expected to study at ITMO Highpark; the campus is said to provide 12,000 jobs and host 5 innovative production facilities and approximately 50 international laboratories.

The project's scientific area of focus is in applied research and fields such as intelligent technologies, cyberphysical systems, photonics, quantum technologies, and biochemistry. The resident businesses' areas of activity will aim to develop the markets of urban studies, safe/smart cities, the exploration of new territories, extreme environments and virtual worlds, and creative industries.

ITMO Highpark's cost is estimated to be more than 41 billion rubles; of that amount, 53% is said to be invested from the federal budget, 12% from the city's budget, and 35% provided by private investors.

In 2019, ITMO Highpark's architectural concept design, developed by Russian and British architects, was shortlisted for the World Architecture Festival Award, one of the most prestigious prizes in the field of architecture.

In May 2020, the Government of St. Petersburg approved the plan for the first stage of construction of ITMO Highpark. The construction was expected to start in late 2020–early 2021. The first stage, which includes the main academic building, a dormitory, the student club, the science museum, and street infrastructure, was to be completed in 2022. The second stage (which includes research centers, a second dormitory, a sports facility, and a business incubator as part of the Techno Valley) was to be finished by the end of 2023; the third stage (includes the National Center for Urban Studies, the Data Processing Center, a business incubator as part of the Business Park, and the social infrastructure of Yuzhny) was to be completed in 2027.

== Publishing, library, museum ==
=== Publishing ===
Along with training aids, ITMO University produces a variety of publications. To celebrate the university's 100 anniversary in 2000 it launched two series of books: "National Research University ITMO: Years and People," and monographs "Outstanding People of ITMO University."

The official newspaper "ITMO University" has been in print since 1931. Launched as "New Talent," it has changed its name several times over the eras: "For Precise Instrumentation," "Instrument Builder," "New Talent for Instrumentation." In 1956 it was halted due to budget cuts and reemerged in 1994 as "Technical University ITMO" but was not produced on a regular basis. In 2013, it came out twice a year. Since 2015 it became a monthly, with the exception of summer months, and offers an extended version online.

Scientific journals

- "Proceedings of Higher Educational Institutions. Instrumentation." The journal was among the scientific publications launched by the Ministry of Higher Education in 1957. The first issue "Proceedings of USSR Universities–Instrumentation" came out in January 1958. In 1991, some 3,000 copies of 12 issues were published annually and delivered by subscription. In 1992 the circulation dropped sharply and by 1997 only 9 issues were published annually. Since 2015 it's back to 12 issues a year.
- "Scientific and Technical Gazette of IT, Mechanics and Optics." Originally launched in 1936, it was reestablished in 2001. It 2011 it got its current name. It comes out 6 times a year and is indexed.
- "Nanosystems: Physics, Chemistry, Math." 6 issues a year. Indexed.
- "Optical Journal." Launched in 1931. 12 issues a year. Indexed.
- "Scientific Journal of NRU ITMO." Series "Refrigeration technology and air conditioning." Electronic edition comes out twice a year. Launched in 2007. Since 2013 titled "The Journal of the Institute of Refrigeration and Biotechnology".
- "Scientific Journal of NRU ITMO." Series "Processes and Food Processing Equipment." Electronic edition comes out four times a year. Launched in 2006 as a collection of papers, it became a scientific periodical in 2008. Before 2013 it was titled "The Journal of the Institute of Refrigeration and Biotechnology." Indexed.
- "Scientific Journal of NRU ITMO." Series "Economics and Eco Management." Electronic edition comes out four times a year. Launched in 2007. Before 2013 it was titled "The Journal of the Institute of Refrigeration and Biotechnology." Indexed.

=== Library ===
The university is a member of the Library Association of Russia, St. Petersburg Library Society, National Electronic Information Consortium, and the Association of Regional Library Consortiums. The ITMO University library offers access to Russian and foreign full-text and reference electronic resources, including Web of Science, Conference Proceedings Citation, Journal Citation Reports, Scopus, ScienceDirect, Springer, ACM, OSA, SPIE, eLibrary, etc.

The year 1900 is considered the library's foundation year. By 1925, it contained 2,600 books and by 1945–over 90,000. Initially the library was situated in a building on Pereulok Grivtzova. During the WWII it was evacuated to Cherepanovo and returned with re-evacuation. In 1970 it got a dedicated space in the university's main building on Ulitza Sablina.

In 1998 the library created a department for computerization of library processes and adopted "Irbis" library information system. In 2002 the university got a grant from the National Fund for Personnel Development for "Improving management of library resources and forming an open educational environment of the university." The library as of 2015 was working on forming an electronic catalogue.

The library of the Faculty of Associate Level Education became a department of the main library in 2003 and contains the books from the former Mechanical College #1 that merged with the university that year. The readers who had been in Leningrad during the Siege of the WWII donated the first books to the college in 1945. By 2000, it contained over 44,000 books and grew to 56,000 by 2008 with the addition of the library of the Marine Instrumentation College.

In 2005 the library absorbed the collection from the library of the State Optical Institute, which dates back to 1918. In 1974 the State Optical Institute library was granted a status of a collection on optics and optical instrumentation of state importance and became a resource for several university libraries as well as industry. In 2006 the library received over 10,000 books from the Academy of Management that also became part of the university. In 2011 it also got the books from the library of the Institute of Refrigeration and Food Processing that dates back to 1931, survived the Siege and by 1980 contained over 550,000 books and over a million by the time of merger.

=== Museums ===
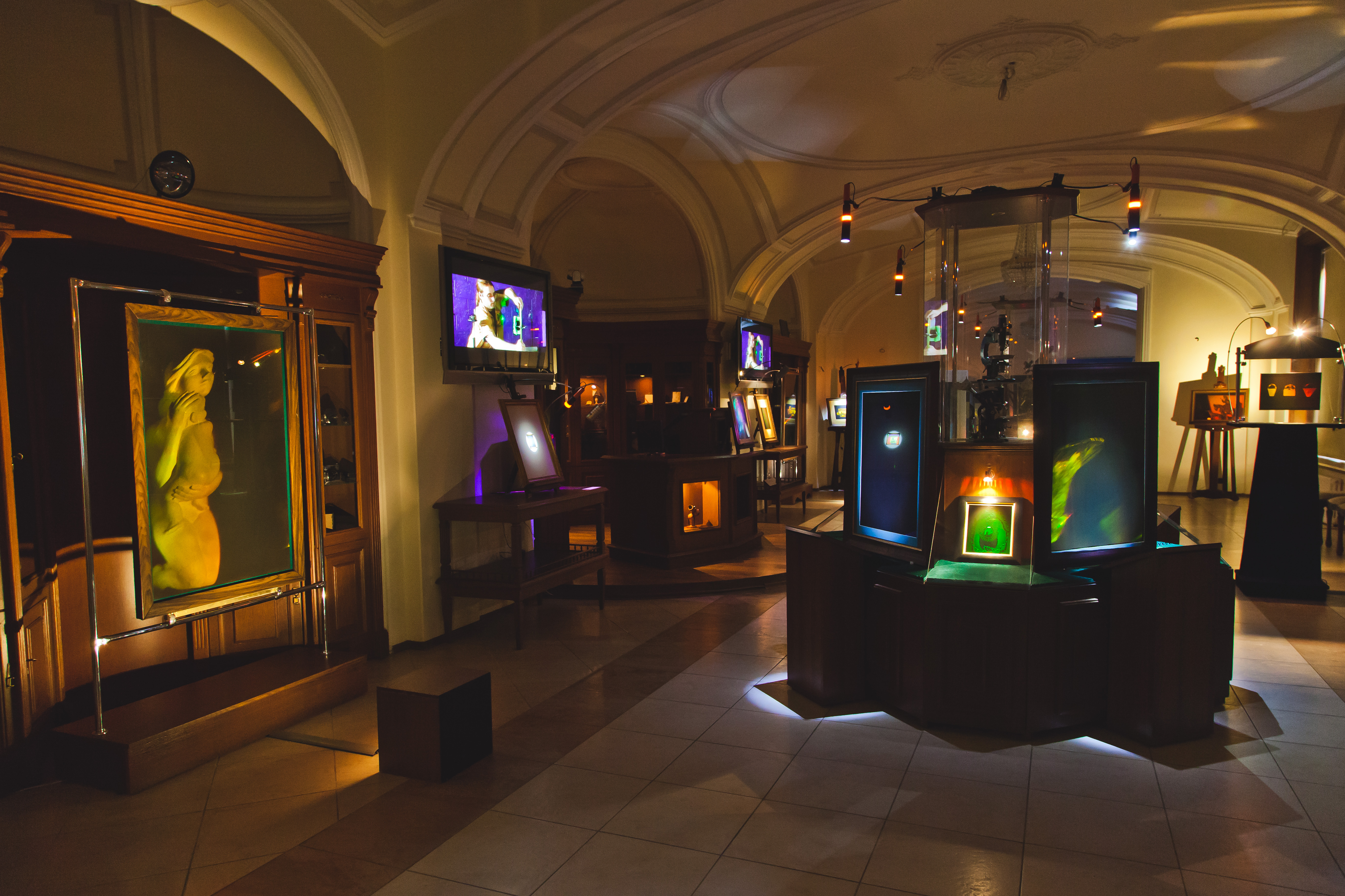
Exhibition "Magic of Light" at ITMO University, 2015

ITMO University has three museums. "Museum of ITMO University History" is located in the building on Pereulok Grivtzova.

The Museum of Optics was established in 2006 and is located on the first floor of the Eliseev House on Birzhevaya Linia. With support from the Hellenic Institute of Holography, ITMO University opened an exhibition "Magic of Light" in 2015. The Eliseev House was selected for the exhibition because it used to house the office of Prof. Denisuk, the founder of image holography. It features over 200 holograms, including OptoClones of Imperial Fabergé eggs, Oculus Rift virtual reality glasses and more. The inner courtyard houses Lux Aeterna Laser Theater.

The Museum of the Institute of Refrigeration and Biotechnologies, dating back to 1936, is located in a historic building on Lomonosova Street.

In 2012 the university won a competition by a Committee on Investments to come up with a concept of an interactive museum of science and technology that will be built on the grounds of the former tram park on Vasilyevsky Island.

In Lakhta Center, ITMO University was as of 2013 building one of the largest children's science museums in the country, around 7,000 sq. m., with support of Saint Petersburg government.

== Student life ==
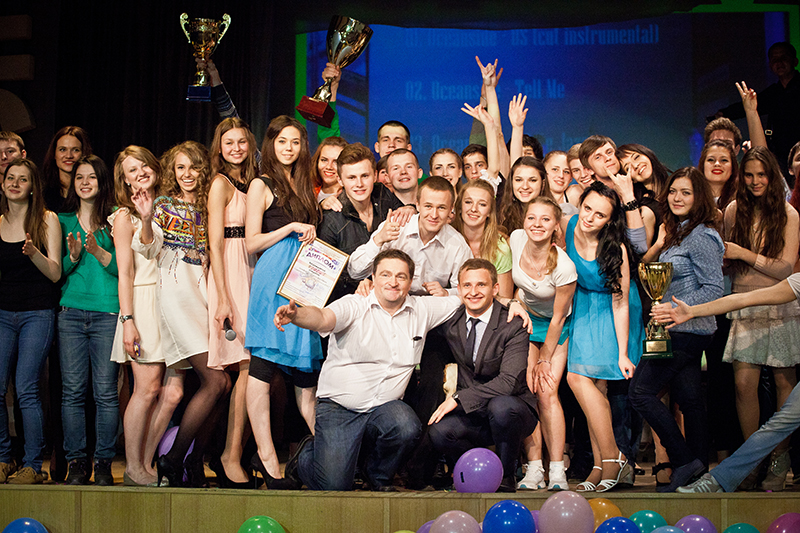
Students participate in the project "Student Spring", 2013

The university has student unions, including those for foreign students, student clubs, a student orchestra, student radio, a student scientific society, and volunteer center. Many of these organizations get together in coworking spaces around the campus. The students can use these spaces for their own projects, but some, such as SumIT, require a prior interview.

The university has two assembly halls that can hold up to 500 people each. Other activity spaces include a soundproof room for singing lessons, an audio recording studio, a studio for "Megabyte" internet radio and editorial office of "NewTone" magazine.

=== Accommodations ===
The university offers accommodations in six dorms. Depending on a student's individual circumstances, accommodation may also be provided at the Inter-university student campus on Novoizmailovskii Prospect, 16.

=== Main Building ===
Campus and dorms

- Kronverksky prospect, d. 49
- Birzhevaya linia, d. 4
- Birzhevaya linia, d. 16
- Birzhevaya linia, d. 14
- Grivtsova per., d. 14-16
- Pesochnaya nab., d. 14
- Chaikovskogo ul., d. 11/2
- Gastello ul., d. 12
- Kadetskaya Linia V.О., d. 3, k.2
- Novoizmailovsky prospect, d. 34, k. 3
- Vyazemsky per., d. 5-7
- 2 Komsomolskaya ul., d. 5
- 2 Komsomolskaya ul, d. 7, k. 1
- Serebristiy bul., d. 29, k. 1
- Khrustalnaya ul, d. 14
- Lomonosova ul, d. 9
- Alpiysky per., d. 15, k.2
- Belorusskaya ul, d. 6
- Lensoveta ul, d.23

=== Sports ===
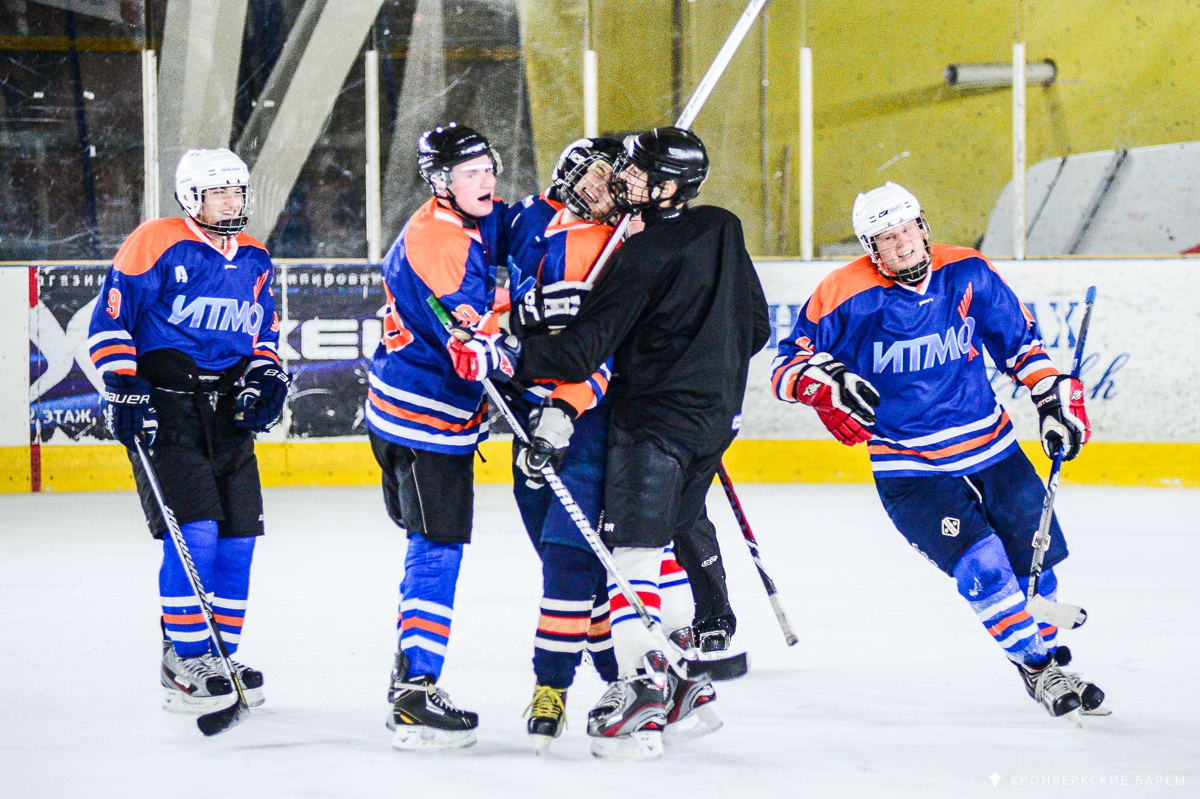
Members of the university's hockey team.

The university has its own sporting infrastructure. Sports clubs are located on Vjazemsky Pereulok and Lomonosova Street, and there's also a sportsground by the main building. The university also owns a recreational facility, Yagodnoe, located by the Berestovoe Lake, near Losevo, in the Leningrad Oblast.

The university's futsal team won a silver medal at 2013 "Golden League" championship and took bronze in 2015.

Since 2014, the university's rector Vladimir Vasilyev has been heading a series of bi-annual bike rides for students and staff in the vicinity of the Krestovsky Island.

== Building collapse ==
On February 16, 2019, multiple news sources reported a building collapse at one of ITMO University's buildings on Lomonosova Street 9. Initial reports indicated that four floors of the building–floors two through five–had collapsed. 80 people were evacuated, and emergency crews were on the scene. Other news outlets initially reported that the collapse occurred as the result of construction work in the building.

== Honored doctors ==
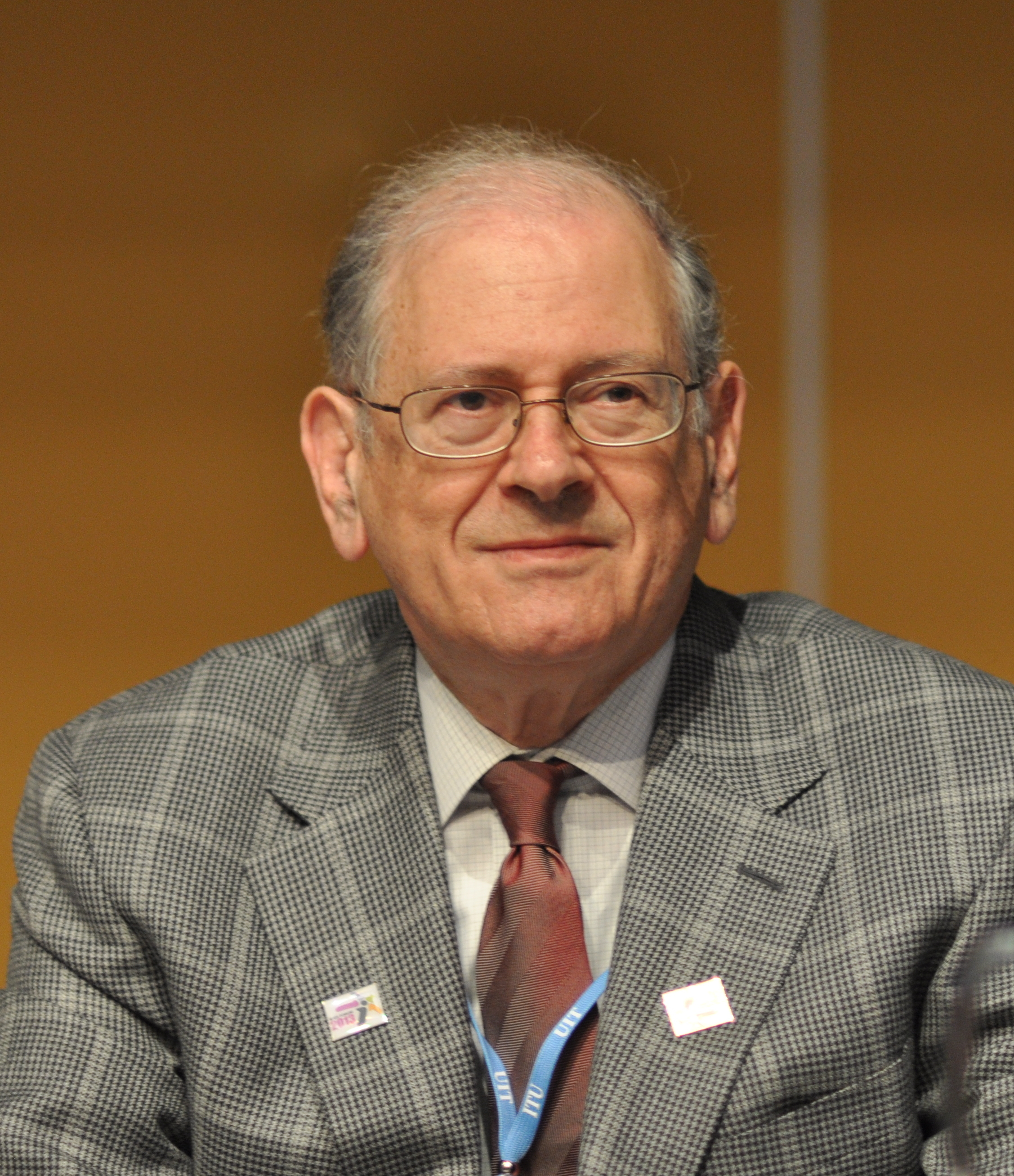
Robert Elliot Kahn

- Askar Akayev, Kyrgyz Professor, foreign member of the Russian Academy of Sciences (2000), President Kyrgyz Republic, graduated from LITMO (1968)
- Wilfred Joseph Goodman, Doctor of Electrical Engineering (Stanford University), former president of the American Optical Society (OSA), ex-president of the International Commission for Optics (ICO), former chief editor of OSA
- Yuri Denisyuk, member of the Russian Academy of Sciences, graduate LITMO (1954), one of the founders of optical holography
- Robert Elliot Kahn, American inventor of protocols TCP and IP, underlying the functioning of the Internet
- Ilya Klebanov, authorized representative President in Northwestern Federal District (2003–2011), Director General JSC "LOMO" (1992–1997)
- Bertrand Meyer, French Professor, Head of Software Engineering in ETH Zurich
- Mikhail Miroshnikov, scientific consultant of the Department of Computer photonics
- Gury Petrovsky, Professor, Director General Vavilov State Optical Institute(1994–2002)
- Dmitry Vasilyevich Sergeyev, first deputy governor of St. Petersburg, a graduate LITMO (1963)
- Bjarne Stroustrup, Danish professor of the Texas A&M University, Master of Computer Science, University of Aarhus, founder of language C++
- Joseph Feliksberger, Doctor of Science, Head of Applied Technology Degussa, PCI Augsburg
- Dale Fuller, American president and CEO "Borland Labs, Inc"
- Gunter Hyun, Professor, Ph.D., Dean of the Faculty of Mechanical Engineering of the Technische Universität Ilmenau
- Tony Hoare, British, one of the founders of discrete mathematics, author of the algorithm Quicksort, the theory of communicating sequential processes (CSP), Hoare logic, widely used for software verification
- John Edward Hopcroft, American specialist in computer science at Cornell University
- Yang Shichin, rector of Harbin Institute of Technology in 1985–2002.
- Klaus-Peter Tsoher, Professor of Technology Faculty of Mechanical Engineering of the Technische Universität Ilmenau
- Niklaus Wirth, Swiss computer science professor, Honorary Doctor of Sciences

== Notable alumni ==
Scientists

- Gennady Korotkevich
- Nadezhda Agaltzeva
- Aleksandr Aronov
- Aziz Azizov
- Pavel Belov
- Gennadiy Dulnev
- Aleksandr Grammatin
- Leonid Konopolko
- Dmitri Sergeev
- Vladimir Vasilyev
- Mark Veyngerov
- Aleksandr Zapesotzki
- Viktor Zverev

Political leaders

- Askar Akaev

Musicians

- Dmitri Tikhonov
- Vasilii Vasin

Athletes

- Boris Lukomsky
- Ekaterina Mamleeva
- Tamara Manina
- Valentin Zanin

Special services

- Sergei Verevkin-Rahalski
- Boris Mylnikov
