= Medal "In Commemoration of the 300th Anniversary of Saint Petersburg" =

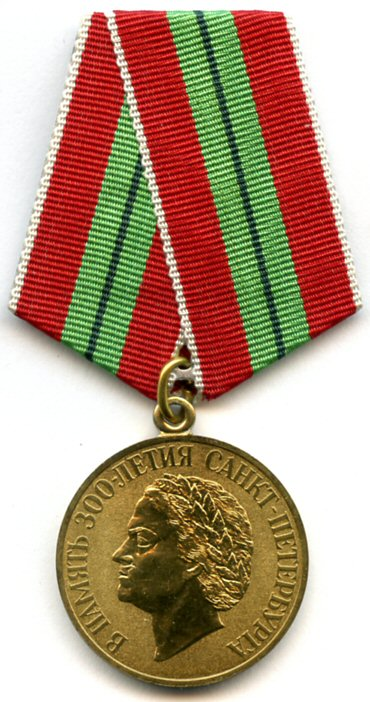
- Medal "In Commemoration of the 300th Anniversary of Saint Petersburg" (obverse)
- Type: State Commemorative Medal
- Awarded for: World War 2 service and/or significant contribution to the development of the city
- Presented by: Russian Federation
- Eligibility: World War 2 veterans and citizens of the Russian Federation
- Status: No longer awarded
- Established: February 19, 2003

Highlights
- Total: 670.000
- Ribbon of the Medal "In Commemoration of the 300th Anniversary of Saint Petersburg"

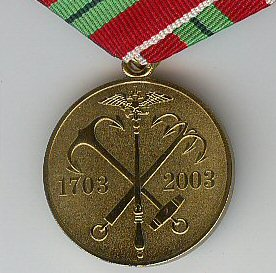
Reverse of the Medal "In Commemoration of the 300th Anniversary of Saint Petersburg"

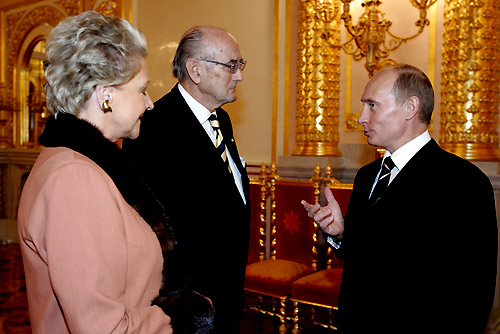
A recipient of the Medal "In Commemoration of the 300th Anniversary of Saint Petersburg" Prince Dimitri Romanov, here in conversation with Russian President Putin in 2006. (Photo www.kremlin.ru)

The Medal "In Commemoration of the 300th Anniversary of Saint Petersburg" (Russian: Медаль «В память 300-летия Санкт-Петербурга») is a state commemorative medal of the Russian Federation established on February 19, 2003, by Presidential Decree No. 210 to denote the 300th anniversary of the foundation of the city of St Petersburg, known as Leningrad during the Soviet Era.

== Medal statute ==
The Medal "In Commemoration of the 300th Anniversary of Saint Petersburg" is awarded to participants of the wartime defence of Leningrad, persons previously awarded the Medal "For the Defence of Leningrad"; residents who were blockaded in Leningrad; wartime workers who worked during the Great Patriotic War of 1941–1945 years in Leningrad and who were awarded state awards; citizens who were previously awarded the Medal "In Commemoration of the 250th Anniversary of Leningrad"; citizens who have made a significant contribution to the development of the city of St. Petersburg.

Presidential Decree 1099 of September 7, 2010 removed the Medal "In Commemoration of the 300th Anniversary of Saint Petersburg" from the list of state awards of the Russian Federation. It is no longer awarded.

== Medal description ==
The Medal "In Commemoration of the 300th Anniversary of Saint Petersburg" is a 32mm in diameter circular brass medal. Its obverse bears the left profile portrait of tsar Peter the Great crowned with a laurel wreath. Along the circumference of the medal, the inscription in relief "In commemoration of the 300th anniversary of St. Petersburg" (Russian: В память 300-летия Санкт-Петербурга"). The medal reverse bears the central motif of the coat of arms of the city of St Petersburg, a vertically raised sceptre superimposed on two crossed anchors - sea and river. On the left of the reverse, the relief inscription "1703", on the right, "2003".

The medal is suspended by a ring through the award's suspension loop to a standard Russian pentagonal mount covered with an overlapping 24mm wide red silk moiré ribbon with 1mm white edge stripes, in the center, an 8mm green stripe with a central 1mm black stripe.

== Notable recipients (partial list) ==
The individuals listed below are recipients of the Medal "In Commemoration of the 300th Anniversary of Saint Petersburg".

- Prince of Russia Dimitri Romanovich Romanov
- Former President of France Jacques René Chirac
- President of Kazakhstan Nursultan Abishuly Nazarbayev
- Politician and political activist Vladimir Volfovich Zhirinovsky
- Cosmonaut Sergei Konstantinovich Krikalev
- President of Chechnya Ramzan Akhmadovich Kadyrov
- Marshal of the Soviet Union Dmitry Timofeyevich Yazov
- President of Tatarstan Rustam Nurgaliyevich Minnikhanov
- Former Mayor of Moscow Yury Mikhaylovich Luzhkov
- Conductor and opera company director Valery Abisalovich Gergiev
- Army General, former Minister of Emergency Situations Sergey Kuzhugetovich Shoygu
- Former Interior Minister of Russia Vladimir Borisovich Rushailo
- Archbishop Tadevuš Kandrusievič
- Former President of the Chuvash Republic Nikolay Vasilyevich Fyodorov
- President of the Udmurt Republic Alexander Alexandrovich Volkov
- Former Minister of the Internal Affairs of Russia General Rashid Gumarovich Nurgaliyev
- Governor of the Kurgan Oblast Oleg Alexeyevich Bogomolov
- Actor and singer Mikhail Sergeevich Boyarsky
- Politician and former Governor of Saint Petersburg Valentina Ivanovna Matviyenko
- Governor of Leningrad Oblast Valery Pavlovich Serdyukov
- Politician and journalist Alexander Evseevich Khinshtein
- Geologist and politician Marina Yevgenyevna Salye
- Lawyer and politician Nikolay Alexandrovich Vinnichenko
- Scientist Gennadiy Dulnev

== See also ==
- Awards and decorations of the Russian Federation
- City of St Petersburg
- Siege of Leningrad
- Orders, decorations, and medals of the Soviet Union
