= Michurinsky (rural locality) =

Michurinsky (Russian: Мичу́ринский; masculine), Michurinskaya (Мичу́ринская; feminine), or Michurinskoye (Мичу́ринское; neuter) is the name of several rural localities in Russia:

- Michurinsky, Altai Krai, a settlement in Rubtsovsky Selsoviet of Rubtsovsky District of Altai Krai
- Michurinsky, Belgorod Oblast, a settlement in Korochansky District of Belgorod Oblast
- Michurinsky, Bryansk Oblast, a settlement in Michurinsky Selsoviet of Bryansky District of Bryansk Oblast
- Michurinsky, Chelyabinsk Oblast, a settlement in Michurinsky Selsoviet of Kartalinsky District of Chelyabinsk Oblast
- Michurinsky, Kaliningrad Oblast, a settlement under the administrative jurisdiction of Neman Town of District Significance, Nemansky District, Kaliningrad Oblast
- Michurinsky, Karachay-Cherkess Republic, a settlement in Prikubansky District of the Karachay-Cherkess Republic
- Michurinsky, Iskitimsky District, Novosibirsk Oblast, a settlement in Iskitimsky District, Novosibirsk Oblast
- Michurinsky, Novosibirsky District, Novosibirsk Oblast, a settlement in Novosibirsky District, Novosibirsk Oblast
- Michurinsky, Penza Oblast, a settlement in Michurinsky Selsoviet of Penzensky District of Penza Oblast
- Michurinsky, Rostov Oblast, a settlement in Pobedenskoye Rural Settlement of Volgodonskoy District of Rostov Oblast
- Michurinsky, Tyumen Oblast, a settlement in Zavodoukovsky District of Tyumen Oblast
- Michurinsky, Volgograd Oblast, a settlement in Michurinsky Selsoviet of Kamyshinsky District of Volgograd Oblast
- Michurinsky, Ertilsky District, Voronezh Oblast, a settlement under the administrative jurisdiction of Ertilskoye Urban Settlement, Ertilsky District, Voronezh Oblast
- Michurinsky, Paninsky District, Voronezh Oblast, a settlement in Mikhaylovskoye Rural Settlement of Paninsky District of Voronezh Oblast
- Michurinskoye, Altai Krai, a selo in Michurinsky Selsoviet of Khabarsky District of Altai Krai
- Michurinskoye, Gusevsky District, Kaliningrad Oblast, a settlement under the administrative jurisdiction of Gusev Town of District Significance, Gusevsky District, Kaliningrad Oblast
- Michurinskoye, Nesterovsky District, Kaliningrad Oblast, a settlement in Chistoprudnensky Rural Okrug of Nesterovsky District of Kaliningrad Oblast
- Michurinskoye, Khabarovsk Krai, a selo in Khabarovsky District of Khabarovsk Krai
- Michurinskoye, Leningrad Oblast, a logging depot settlement in Michurinskoye Settlement Municipal Formation of Priozersky District of Leningrad Oblast
