= Bryansk constituency =

Russian legislative constituency

Bryansk single-member constituency
- Constituency of the Russian State Duma

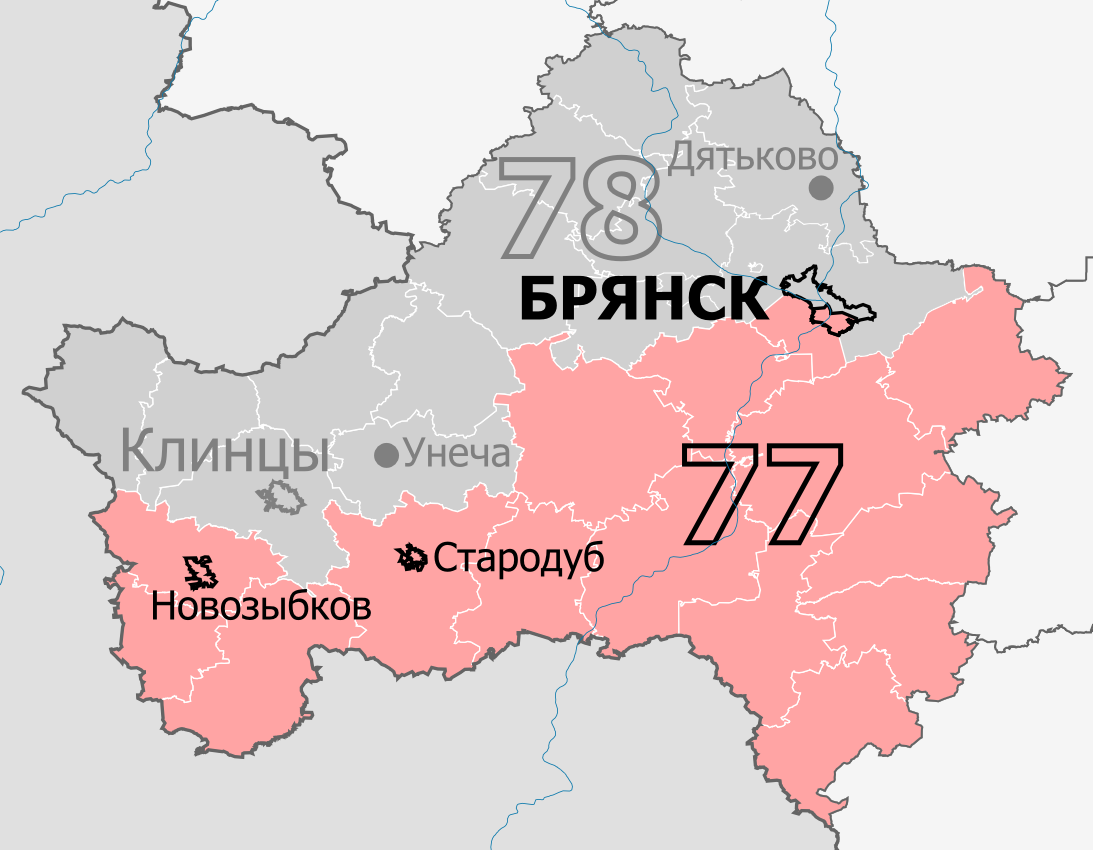
- Constituency boundaries since 2016
- Deputy: Nikolai Shcheglov; United Russia
- Federal subject: Bryansk Oblast
- Districts: Bryansk, Novozybkov, Brasovsky, Bryansky, Vygonichsky, Zlynkovsky, Karachevsky, Klimovsky, Komarichsky, Navlinsky, Novozybkovsky, Pogarsky, Pochepsky, Sevsky, Starodubsky, Suzemsky, Trubchevsky
- Voters: 462,484 (2026)

The Bryansk constituency (No.81 (Note: No.65 in 1993–1995, No.64 in 1995–2003, No.66 in 2003–2007, No.77 in 2016–2026)) is a Russian legislative constituency in Bryansk Oblast. The constituency covers southern Bryansk and southern Bryansk Oblast.

The constituency has been represented since 2026 by United Russia deputy Nikolai Shcheglov, two-term State Duma member and former Deputy Governor of Bryansk Oblast, who won the open seat after three-term United Russia incumbent Nikolay Valuyev successfully sought re-election on the party list.

== Boundaries ==
1993–2007: Brasovsky District, Bryansk, Bryansky District, Dyatkovo, Dyatkovsky District, Karachevsky District, Komarichsky District, Navlinsky District, Seltso, Sevsky District
The constituency covered eastern edge of Bryansk Oblast, including the oblast capital of Bryansk, cities of Dyatkovo and Seltso.

2016–present: Brasovsky District, Bryansk (Fokinsky, Sovetsky), Bryansky District (Dobrun, Michurinsky, Putyovka, Suponevo, Sven), Karachevsky District, Klimovsky District, Komarichsky District, Navlinsky District, Novozybkov, Novozybkovsky District, Pochepsky District, Pogarsky District, Sevsky District, Starodubsky District, Suzemsky District, Trubchevsky District, Vygonichsky District, Zlynkovsky District
The constituency was re-created for the 2016 election and it retained southern half of Bryansk, its southwestern suburbs and southeastern corner of Bryansk Oblast, losing the rest to new Unecha constituency. This seat instead gained rural southern Bryansk Oblast, including the city Novozybkov, from the former Pochep constituency.

== Members elected ==
By-elections are shown in italics.

Election	Member	Party
1993	Anatoly Vorontsov	Agrarian Party
1995	Vasiliy Shandybin	Communist Party
1999	Vasiliy Shandybin	Communist Party
2003	Nikolay Denin (Note: in 2004 was elected Governor of Bryansk Oblast)	United Russia
2006	Viktor Malashenko	United Russia
2007	Proportional representation - no election by constituency	
2011	Proportional representation - no election by constituency	
2016	Vladimir Zhutenkov (Note: in 2017 resigned)	United Russia
2017	Boris Paykin	Liberal Democratic Party
2021	Nikolay Valuyev	United Russia
2026	Nikolai Shcheglov	United Russia

== Election results ==
=== 1993 ===
Summary of the 12 December 1993 Russian legislative election in the Bryansk constituency
Candidate	Party	Votes	%
Anatoly Vorontsov	Agrarian Party	94,052	26.79%
Stanislav Belyshev	Choice of Russia	65,863	18.76%
Vyacheslav Grebenshchikov	Independent	47,534	13.54%
Aleksey Bulokhov	Russian Democratic Reform Movement	31,306	8.92%
Valery Derzhavin	Civic Union	19,631	5.59%
against all		61,771	17.59%
invalid ballots		30,920	8.81%
Total		351,077	100%
Registered voters/turnout		574,715	61.09%

=== 1995 ===
Summary of the 17 December 1995 Russian legislative election in the Bryansk constituency
Candidate	Party	Votes	%
Vasily Shandybin	Communist Party	127,741	32.86%
Valery Khramchenkov	Liberal Democratic Party	40,937	10.53%
Sergey Simutin	Forward, Russia!	30,369	7.81%
Valentina Brezanskaya	Women of Russia	20,817	5.36%
Viktor Sinenko	Our Home – Russia	17,261	4.44%
Boris Kopyrnov	Agrarian Party	16,343	4.20%
Anatoly Tokarev	Duma-96	12,712	3.27%
Vladimir Leonov	Independent	11,880	3.06%
Valery Polyakov	Independent	10,964	2.82%
Vladimir Fetisov	Independent	10,812	2.78%
Gennady Shilin	Congress of Russian Communities	10,163	2.61%
Valery Korneyenkov	Independent	7,325	1.88%
Valery Derzhavin	Derzhava	6,710	1.73%
Sergey Kozlov	Independent	6,640	1.71%
Anatoly Amelin	Transformation of the Fatherland	4,946	1.27%
Aleksandr Senin	Independent	4,878	1.25%
Igor Balyasnikov	League of Independent Scientists	3,885	1.00%
Aleksandr Barsukov	Revival	3,552	0.91%
Anatoly Vaskov	Independent	1,172	0.30%
against all		33,770	8.69%
Total		388,707	100%

=== 1999 ===
Results by district: Vasily Shandybin: 30–40% 40–50% 50–60%; Nikolay Denin: 30–40% 40–50%

Summary of the 19 December 1999 Russian legislative election in the Bryansk constituency
Candidate	Party	Votes	%
Vasily Shandybin (incumbent)	Communist Party	132,346	36.59%
Nikolay Denin	Independent	64,150	17.73%
Lyudmila Komogortseva	Union of Right Forces	26,913	7.44%
Lyudmila Narusova	Independent	21,349	5.90%
Sergey Kurdenko	Liberal Democratic Party	12,308	3.40%
Anatoly Bugayev	Independent	10,134	2.80%
Anatoly Chernyavsky	Our Home – Russia	10,077	2.79%
Andrey Ponomarev	Yabloko	9,858	2.73%
Olga Denisova	Independent	8,466	2.34%
Aleksandr Salov	Fatherland – All Russia	8,185	2.26%
Gennady Gorelov	Independent	4,749	1.31%
Aleksandr Kolomeytsev	Independent	3,370	0.93%
Marina Paramoshkina	Spiritual Heritage	3,076	0.85%
Nikolay Ignatkov	Independent	2,825	0.78%
Anatoly Karamyshev	Russian Socialist Party	1,628	0.45%
Nikolay Zuykov	Independent	1,160	0.32%
against all		34,926	9.66%
Total		361,730	100%

=== 2003 ===
Results by district: Nikolay Denin: 20–30% 30–40% 40–50%; Vasily Shandybin: 20–30% 30–40%

Summary of the 7 December 2003 Russian legislative election in the Bryansk constituency
Candidate	Party	Votes	%
Nikolay Denin	United Russia	99,845	31.95%
Vasily Shandybin (incumbent)	Communist Party	79.415	25.41%
Georgy Abushenko	Party of Russia's Rebirth-Russian Party of Life	29,628	9.48%
Nikolay Rudenok	Social Democratic Party	21,067	6.74%
Lyudmila Komogortseva	Independent	17,912	5.73%
Ivan Fedotkin	Union of Right Forces	12,377	3.96%
Sergey Maslov	Liberal Democratic Party	7,464	2.39%
Andrey Ponomarev	Yabloko	3,466	1.11%
Aleksandr Ishchenko	National Patriotic Forces of Russian Federation	3,223	1.03%
Yury Grishin	Independent	2,984	0.95%
Maria Belousova	Independent	2,869	0.92%
Tatyana Martynova	United Russian Party Rus'	2,305	0.74%
Aleksandr Kolomoyets	Independent	1,631	0.52%
Zuleikhat Ulbasheva	Great Russia–Eurasian Union	482	0.15%
against all		23,879	7.64%
Total		312,511	100%

=== 2005 ===
The results of the by-election were invalidated due to low turnout and another by-election was scheduled for 12 March 2006

Summary of the 24 April 2005 Russian by-election in the Bryansk single-member constituency
Candidate	Party	Votes	%
Viktor Malashenko	United Russia	63,900	44.89%
Andrey Ivanov	Independent	47,736	33.53%
Vladimir Babakov	Independent	4,375	3.07%
Mikhail Veselkin	Independent	2,691	1.89%
against all		20,003	14.05%
Total		142,336	100%

=== 2006 ===
Summary of the 12 March 2006 Russian by-election in the Bryansk single-member constituency
Candidate	Party	Votes	%
Viktor Malashenko	United Russia	108,773	62.40%
Valery Khramchenkov	Liberal Democratic Party	27,553	15.80%
against all		31,803	18.24%
Total		174,289	100%

=== 2016 ===
Summary of the 18 September 2016 Russian legislative election in the Bryansk single-member constituency
Candidate	Party	Votes	%
Vladimir Zhutenkov	United Russia	166,146	57.22%
Aleksandr Bogomaz	Yabloko	29,684	10.22%
Konstantin Pavlov	Communist Party	27,840	9.59%
Dmitry Vinokurov	Liberal Democratic Party	25,644	8.83%
Valery Khramchenkov	A Just Russia	9,640	3.32%
Yelena Shanina	Communists of Russia	9,090	3.13%
Aleksey Alkhimov	Patriots of Russia	3,973	1.37%
Roman Lobzin	Rodina	3,563	1.23%
Mikhail Lelebin	Party of Growth	3,191	1.10%
Dmitry Kornilov	Civic Platform	2,450	0.84%
Total		281,221	100%

=== 2017 ===
Summary of the 10 September 2017 Russian by-election in the Bryansk single-member constituency
Candidate	Party	Votes	%
Boris Paykin	Liberal Democratic Party	93,794	52.03%
Sergey Gorelov	Party of Growth	17,120	9.50%
Aleksandr Kupriyanov	Communist Party	16,911	9.38%
Sergey Kurdenko	A Just Russia	11,123	6.17%
Vladimir Vorozhtsov	Party of Pensioners	8,814	4.89%
Konstantin Kasaminsky	Patriots of Russia	6,928	3.84%
Olga Matokhina	Yabloko	6,746	3.74%
Sergey Malinkovich	Communists of Russia	6,159	3.42%
Nikolay Alekseyenko	Rodina	4,890	2.71%
Total		172,485	100%

=== 2021 ===
Summary of the 17-19 September 2021 Russian legislative election in the Bryansk constituency
Candidate	Party	Votes	%
Nikolay Valuyev	United Russia	206,442	62.56%
Konstantin Pavlov	Communist Party	49,574	15.02%
Aleksey Timoshkov	A Just Russia — For Truth	17,313	5.25%
Denis Semenov	Liberal Democratic Party	14,759	4.47%
Denis Nosenko	New People	10,838	3.28%
Andrey Zimonin	Party of Pensioners	10,217	3.10%
Sergey Gorelov	Party of Growth	5,291	1.60%
Dmitry Kornilov	Civic Platform	4,642	1.41%
Roman Lobzin	Rodina	3,655	1.11%
Total		329,981	100%

=== 2026 ===
Summary of the 18-20 September 2026 Russian legislative election in the Bryansk constituency
Candidate	Party	Votes	%
Nikolai Shcheglov	United Russia	218,239	61.44%
Andrey Arkhitsky	Communist Party	52,046	14.65%
Ruslan Titov	Liberal Democratic Party	35,529	10.00%
Sergey Novikov	New People	20,146	5.67%
Ivan Filimonov	A Just Russia	13,412	3.78%
Yelena Degtyareva	Communists of Russia	13,023	3.67%
Total		355,179	100%
