= 2017 Bryansk by-election =

← 2016	10 September 2017	2021 →
- Turnout: 36.0%
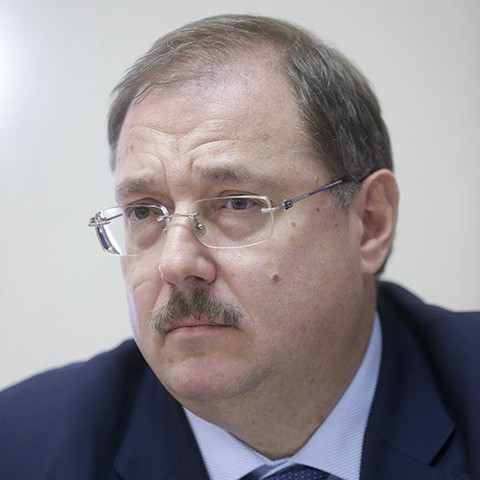
Nominee	Boris Paykin	Sergey Gorelov
Party	LDPR	Party of Growth
Popular vote	93,794	17,120
Percentage	52.0%	9.5%
Deputy of the State Duma before election
Vladimir Zhutenkov
United Russia
Elected Deputy of the State Duma
Boris Paykin
LDPR

Legislative elections were held in Russia on 18 September 2016. On 10 June 2017 Vladimir Zhutenkov resigned. On 14 June, the Central Election Commission scheduled a by-election in the Bryansk constituency for 10 September 2017.

== 2016 result ==
Candidates	Party	Votes	%
Vladimir Zhutenkov	United Russia	166,146	57.2
Alexander Bogomaz	Yabloko	29,684	10.2
Konstantin Pavlov	Communist Party	27,840	9.6
Dmitry Vinokurov	Liberal Democratic Party	25,644	8.8
Valery Khramchenkov	A Just Russia	9,640	3.3
Yelena Shanina	Communists of Russia	9,090	3.1
Alexey Alkhimov	Patriots of Russia	3,973	1.4
Roman Lobzin	Rodina	3,563	1.3
Mikhail Lelebin	Party of Growth	3,191	1.1
Dmitry Kornilov	Civic Platform	2,450	0.8
Artyom Suvorov	Civilian Power	2,365	0.8
Invalid votes		6,773	1.2

== Candidates ==
=== Registered ===
Candidates on the ballot:

- Party of Growth: Sergey Gorelov, businessman, 2016 candidate for State Duma in the Unecha constituency (Bryansk Oblast)
- Rodina: Nikolay Alekseyenko, businessman
- Communists of Russia: Sergey Malinkovich, deputy of Smolninskoye Municipal Okrug Assembly (Saint Petersburg), 2016 candidate for State Duma
- Communist Party: Aleksandr Kupriyanov, secretary of ideology of CPRF Bryansk regional office
- Liberal Democratic Party: Boris Paykin, billionaire, partner at Fort Group, 2016 candidate for State Duma in the Central constituency (Saint Petersburg)
- Patriots of Russia: Konstantin Kasaminsky, Deputy Head of Administration of Karachevsky District
- Yabloko: Olga Matokhina, local activist, 2016 candidate for State Duma in the Unecha constituency (Bryansk Oblast)
- Party of Pensioners: Vladimir Vorozhtsov, former First Deputy Director of Federal Tax Police Service (2000-2002), 2016 candidate for State Duma
- A Just Russia: Sergey Kurdenko, deputy of Klimovo Council of People's Deputies, 2016 candidate for State Duma for this seat

=== Denied registration ===
- Great Fatherland Party: Nikolay Starikov, writer, leader of Great Fatherland Party

=== Withdrew ===
- Independent: Nikolay Burbyga, former Chief Federal Inspector for Bryansk Oblast
- Independent: Andrey Novikov, Bryansk City Council of People's Deputies staffer

=== Declined ===
- United Russia: Aleksandr Khinshtein, former member of State Duma (2003-2016)
- United Russia: Viktor Malashenko, former member of State Duma (2006-2011, 2014-2016)
- Communist Party: Pyotr Romanov, former member of State Duma (1995-2016)

== Result ==
Summary of the 10 September 2017 Russian by-election in the Bryansk single-member constituency election results
Candidate	Party	Votes	%
Boris Paykin	Liberal Democratic Party	93,794	52.0%
Sergey Gorelov	Party of Growth	17,120	9.5%
Alexander Kupriyanov	Communist Party	16,911	9.3%
Sergey Kurdenko	A Just Russia	11,123	6.2%
Vladimir Vorozhtsov	Party of Pensioners	8,814	4.9%
Konstantin Kasaminsky	Patriots of Russia	6,928	3.8%
Olga Matokhina	Yabloko	6,746	3.7%
Sergey Malinkovich	Communists of Russia	6,159	3.4%
Nikolay Alexeyenko	Rodina	4,890	2.7%
Total		172,485	100%
