= Kokino (rural locality) =

Kokino (Russian: Кокино) is the name of several rural localities in Russia:

- Kokino, Komarichsky District, Bryansk Oblast, a village in Komarichsky District of Bryansk Oblast
- Kokino, Vygonichsky District, Bryansk Oblast, a selo in Vygonichsky District of Bryansk Oblast
- Kokino, Kirov Oblast, a village in Yuryansky District of Kirov Oblast
- Kokino, Moscow Oblast, a village in Kashirsky District of Moscow Oblast
