= Kokino (disambiguation) =

Kokino is an archaeological site (megalithic observatory) in North Macedonia, in Staro Nagoričane Municipality.

Kokino may also refer to:

- Kokino, Staro Nagoričane, village in North Macedonia, in Staro Nagoričane Municipality
- Kokino (rural locality), several rural localities in Russia
