= Departments of ITMO University =

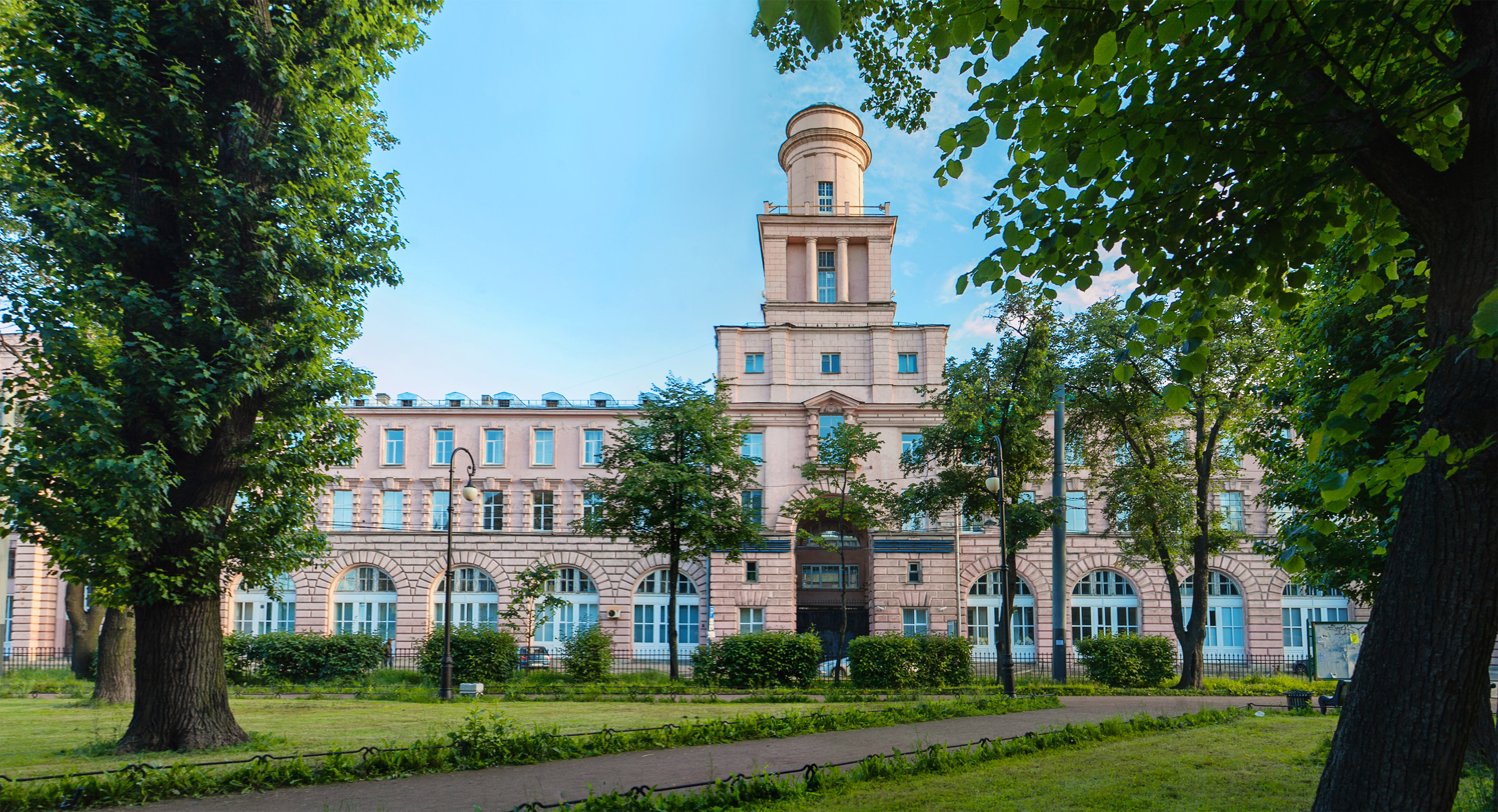
The main building of ITMO University, Kronverksky prospect, 49. 2015

ITMO University is a state-supported National Research University in Saint Petersburg, Russia. It consists of 4 schools, 17 faculties, and 7 research institutes. As of 2021, the total number of students is above 13,400, with over 2,900 being foreign nationals.

== The History of the faculties ==
In February 1900, the Mechanics, Optics and Watchmaking Faculty of the Prince Nicholas vocational school was established, but it wasn't until 26 March 1900 that the establishment, of what is now known as ITMO university, became official. In 1917, this faculty formed a separate Technical College, and in 1930 the Leningrad Institute of Fine Mechanics and Optics (LIFMO) arose out of it. In 1930, LIFMO had two faculties: Fine Mechanics and Optical Mechanics. In 1931, the Computing and Military Training faculties were added, and in 1937, the Technical Science Faculty was also added.

In the 1940s, the Electric Machines Engineering faculty opened, which from 1952 became the Radio Engineering Faculty. Its task was to train engineers in radar technology, which was in demand during the post-war period. Some of the major projects of the Radio Engineering Faculty were the development of an underwater installation prototype CTS-1 (1958–1959), and in the 1950s the creation of a high-speed Belinograph for producing a Wirephoto with planar scan (supervised by Professor Mikhail Rusinov)."

In the 1960s, quantum electronics was taught at the university, and within ten years the Faculty of Optical Electronic Instrumentation was established.

In the spring of 1946, with the support of Sergey Vavilov, the Faculty of Engineering and Physics opened (it was closed from 1955 to 1976), which continued until 2015 and became the basis of a new and larger Faculty of Laser and Light Engineering. In 1962, the Technical Computing Faculty was created.

Humanities subjects were taught at the University since the 1930s and included subjects such as social sciences and political economy. English, German and French languages were always taught at the University. However, it was not until the early 1990s that the Humanities Faculty came into being.

Some students from the Department of Physical Education and Sports have won major national competitions and some have even participated in the Olympic Games in 1952. These include: Lev Kalyayev (running), Valentina Shaprunova (long jump), Sergei Shilenkov (running), Tamara Manina (gymnastics).

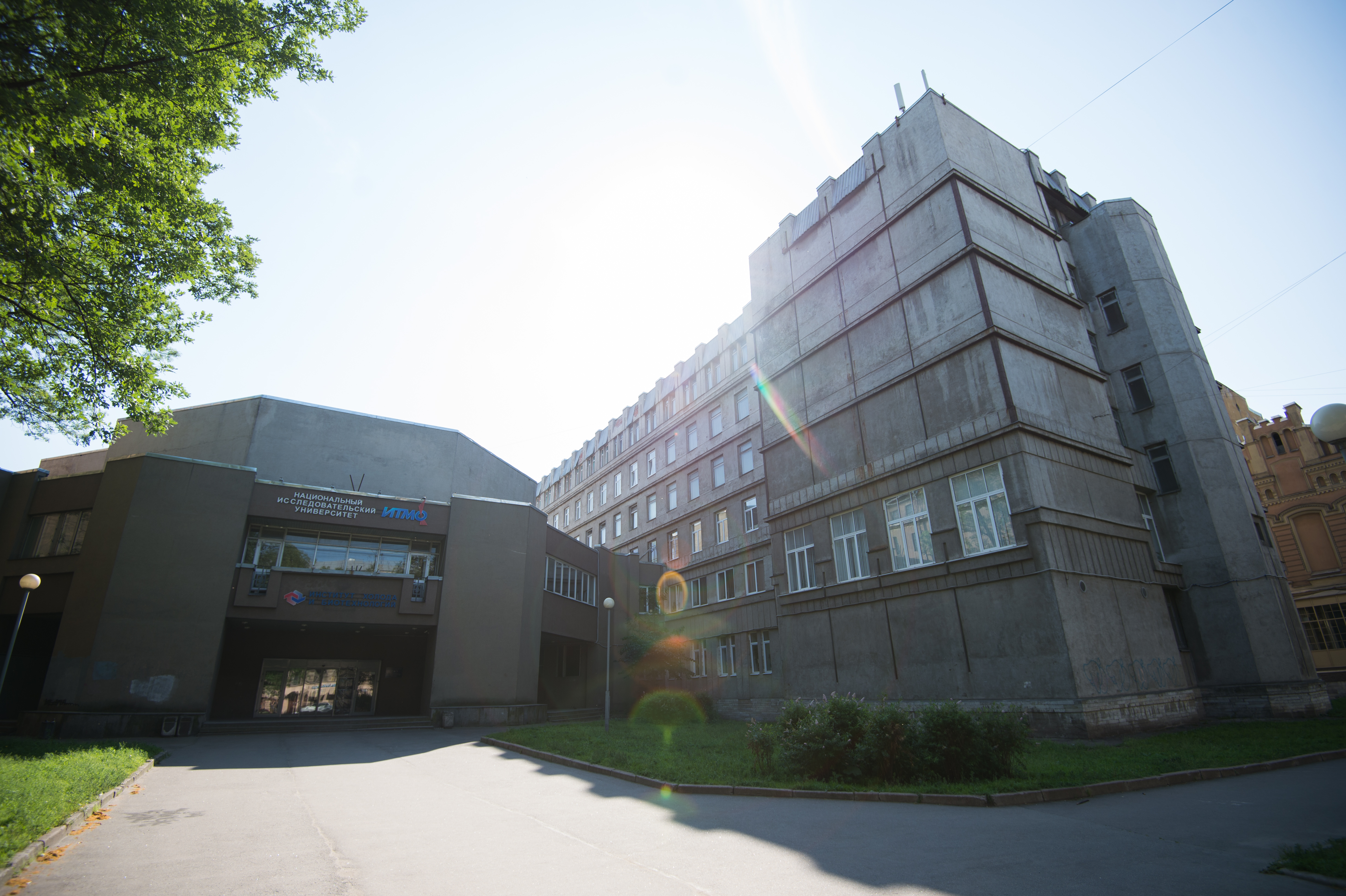
The former building of the St. Petersburg State University of Refrigeration and Food Processing Technologies, on Lomonosova St.

In the 1990s, many new faculties were formed: Computer Technologies and Controls, Natural Sciences, and Optical Information Systems and Technologies. In 1998, the St. Petersburg instrumentation college, joined the University which led to the creation of the Faculty of Secondary Vocational Education in 2003. In February 2008 the St. Petersburg College of Marine Instrumentation also was merged with the faculty.

In 2006, the Academy of Management Methods and Techniques (short name "LIMTU Academy") was incorporated with the University, and later became a faculty in 2015. In 2007, the faculties and departments of the Institute of International Business and Law (now the Faculty of International Business and Law) also joined the university.

On 18 August 2011, the St Petersburg State University of Refrigeration and Food Technology also joined ITMO. It was divided into two faculties: Cryogenic Techniques and Air Conditioning and Food Biotechnologies and Engineering.

As a result of the Project 5–100 in 2014, the Institute of Design and Urbanism and the Institute of Translational Medicine were created at ITMO, and on the basis of the Humanities and Economics Faculty at the former Institute of Refrigeration and Biotechnologies, a new Faculty of Technological Management and Innovations was created.

In 2016 faculties were grouped into three schools:

- School of Computer Technologies and Controls
- School of Translational Information Technologies
- School of Photonics

== School of Computer Technologies and Controls ==
School of Computer Technologies and Control is concentrated on the field of smart control for cyber-physical systems (CPS) that seamlessly integrate cybernetics, computer and software technologies, advanced actuators and sensors to influence physical entities.

=== Faculty of Computer Technologies and Control Systems ===
The Faculty of Computer Technologies and Control Systems emerged in 1991 as a result of renaming the Faculty of Fine Mechanics and Computer Engineering, which was previously known as the Computing Faculty (formed together with LIFMO in the 1930s). The Computing Faculty prepared specialists of computational equipment that were the predecessors to computers.

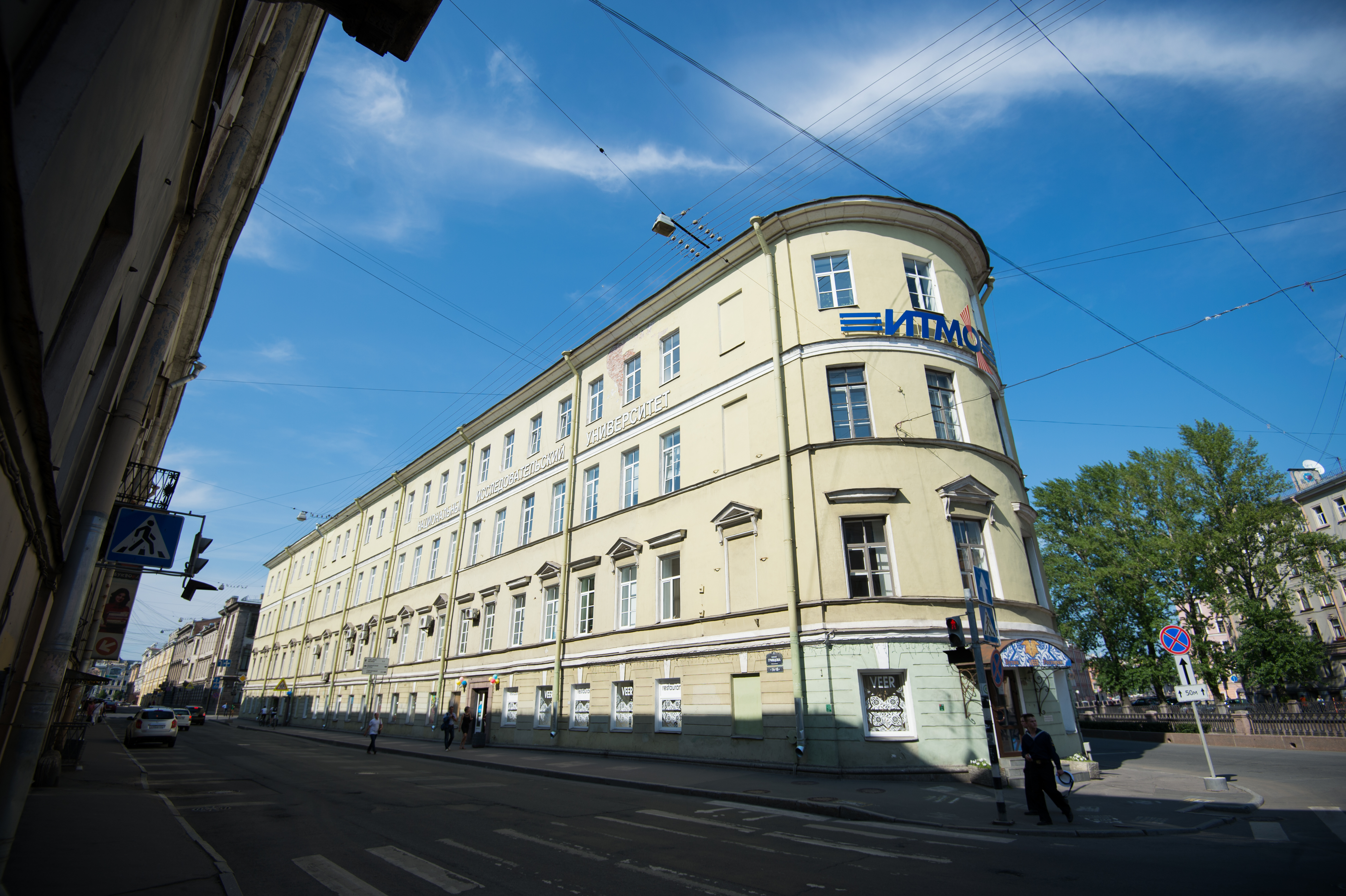
The university building, per. Grivtzova

In 2015, several chairs were reorganized and on the basis of the Faculty of Computer Technologies and Control Systems, an Academic School was created with the same name, which includes three fully functional faculties.

At the Faculty of Computer Technologies and Control Systems students are trained in the field of computer hardware, computer software, automation and remote control, process control and electrical engineering, and information security.

The School is the largest in ITMO. According to data available in 2015, there are more than 2,200 full-time students, and more than 300 employees, which includes research and teaching staff (including an Academic from the Russian Academy of Sciences and more than 40 professors) and teaching support staff.

The partners of the School of Computer Technologies and Management are more than 50 Russian and international enterprises including General Motors, IBM, Microsoft, Sun Microsystems, Maxon Motor, Motorola, State Research Center of the Russian Federation Concern CSRI Elektropribor, experimental design bureau "Electroautomation", LOMO, Kinef, National Research Institute of fine engineering JSC, "Original mechanics and automatics" LLC, "National Research Institute of Precision equipment design", NE JSC, Avionika-vist LLC, Concern Avrora Scientific and Production Association JSC, Eureca CJSC, Kaspersky Lab CJSC, Peterstar, Telecom, Vodokanal, etc.

Within the scientific and student projects and exchanges the School of Computer Technologies and Management is actively cooperating with foreign universities including: University of California, San Diego (San Diego, USA); Northwestern Polytechnic University (Fremont, USA), Mikkeli Polytechnic (Finland), Beijing Polytechnic University (China), University of Cambridge (UK), University of Uppsala (Sweden), Polytechnic Institute of Oulu (Finland), University of Kuopio (Finland), University of London (UK), University of Melbourne (Australia), University of Newcastle (Australia), the Technical University of Eindhoven (Netherlands).

Achievements

The University Departments carry out scientific research work related to the identification of temperature fields, the detection of high speed objects, automatic installation of space telescopes, commissioned by the State.

Since 2002, in cooperation with General Motors, an intelligent hybrid control system of fuel injected engines is being developed. In 2006, the staff of the Department of Control Systems and Information were awarded the prize for "Best Scientific Research Work in the Field of Robotics Systems" at the 4th International Exhibition of Robotics.

During the 2007/2008 academic year, the Department of Computer Science presented embedded computing systems in the international project NESTER (Networked Embedded and Control Systems Technologies for Europe and Russia).

The School's International Laboratories:

- Laboratory of nonlinear and adaptive control systems
- Protection of cryptosystems against side-channel attacks
- Intelligent methods of information processing and semantic technologies
- Power electronics and automated electric drive
- Architecture and design methods of embedded systems and systems-on-chip
- E-learning technology

== School of Translational Information Technologies ==
=== Institute of Design and Urban Studies ===
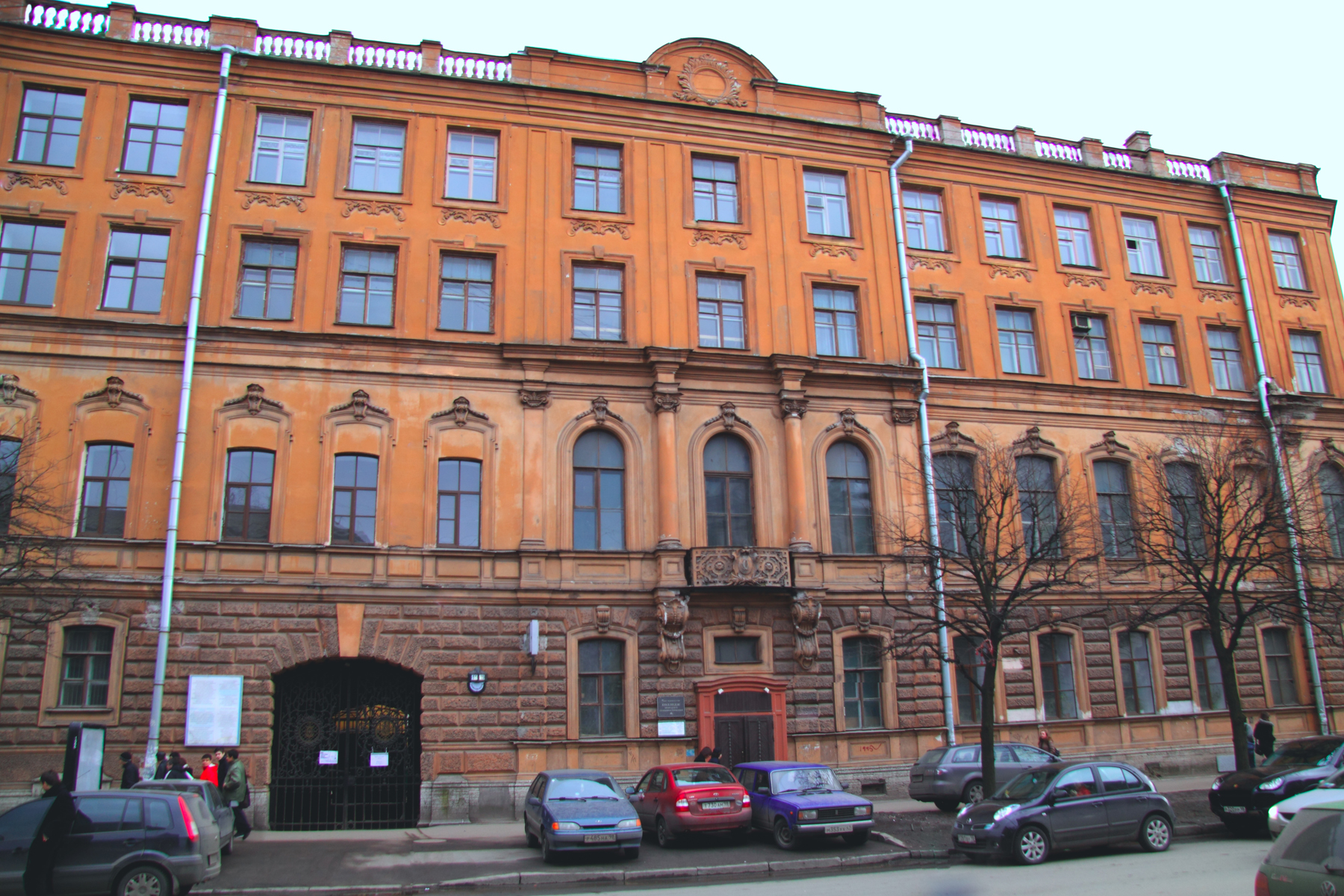
The building on the ul. Chaykovskogo

Founded in 2013, the faculty was originally based on an inter-college business incubator "QD" and the Chair of Technological Entrepreneurship. Now it is an experimental education hub with strong relations with various national and international organizations and stakeholders.

It is presumed that every two years there would be a new manager/curator with experience working on large-scale international projects. There are plans to attract foreign experts on urban sociology and anthropology, geography, architecture, environmental design and urban planning, such as employees of Delft University of Technology and the University of Massachusetts that can provide research centers and offices in Russia, USA and Europe.

Currently it offers a Master's program "Design of Urban Ecosystems". Experts are invited who tutor students in their projects and develop new elements of the curriculum. Prospective students can either take an entrance exam or submit a portfolio with projects. Students actively participate in improving the urban environment of St. Petersburg and nearby cities. For example, through the program "Urban Research Kronstadt", a plan has been prepared for the development of the city until 2030. The project has since been backed by the administration of St. Petersburg's Kronstadt district.

=== Institute of Translational Medicine ===
The institute was established on 2 December 2014 in cooperation with Federal Almazov North-West Research Center as an innovative hub for joint R&D and educational activities in biomedical technologies.

Some of its top areas of research include development of molecular diagnostic techniques, development of medical devices, design of artificial organs, tissue engineering, and gene and cell therapy. The only staff positions in the Institute are administrative. Resident research projects are selected through an open competition. Masters and PhD international educational programs are developed on the basis of these selected research projects.

International research centers at ITM:

- Clinical decision support systems
- International Research Center "Applied Radiophysics"
- Radiation Medicine
- Genomics and Bioinformatics Lab
- Metabolism and Trace Elements Lab

== School of Photonics ==
School of Photonics focuses on both training in the emerging field of photonics of information communication systems (PICS) as well as further research into practical applications of efficient and secure data storage and transfer, communication and computing.

=== Laser and Light Engineering Faculty ===
Laser and Light Engineering Faculty
- Former names: Faculty of Engineering and Physics; Faculty of Optical Information Systems and Technologies
- Established: 2015
- Affiliations: ITMO University
- Dean: Anna Voznesenskaya
- Location: Saint Petersburg, Russia
- Website: iff.ifmo.ru

This Faculty was established in 2015 as part of the Project 5-100 as a result of joining two former faculties: the Faculty of Engineering and Physics (EaP) and the Faculty of Optical Information Systems and Technologies (OISaT). It is the first Faculty in Russia to train specialists in laser equipment.

1930—1945

The Faculty of Optical Information Systems and Technologies was founded in 1930 as the Optical and Mechanical Faculty.

Manufacturing technology of aspherical surfaces, the development of astronomical optics and high-speed filming equipment, the development of interferometry, cardiac devices, and wide-angle lenses are among some of the major achievements of this faculty.

In 1934, the first scientific research laboratory was set up as part of the Department of Optical Glass Technology. The lab was useful in developing methods that eventually relieved the country from importing costly abrasives from the United States.

1946—1955

By order of the Ministry of Higher Education dated 5 May 1946, the Faculty of Engineering and Physics prepared specialists in the area of physical optics, electronics, medical imaging and nuclear physics.

During the period from 1946 to 1955, there were six graduations, the first one in 1950 with 24 graduates, and the last in 1955 with 55 graduates. Following this, the faculty was closed due to the reorganization of the structure of the university. The most famous graduate from this faculty was Yuri Nikolaevich Denisyuk who graduated in 1954. He is known for his great contribution to holography, in particular for the so-called "Denisyuk hologram".

1975—current

In 1975, the Faculty of Engineering and Physics was re-opened. In 2000, three professors of this Faculty received the title of Honored Scientist of the Russian Federation. The current rector of ITMO, Dr. Vladimir Vasilyev, is a former Professor of the Faculty of Engineering and Physics.

In 2015, the faculty was instrumental in providing laser installations for LumiFest in St. Petersburg that ran as part of the UNESCO's Year of light and Light-based Technologies.

Currently the Faculty of Laser and Light Engineering has 11 Departments, 200 lecturers and over 1,300 students. It's also home to the School of Laser Technologies. Its international research labs include:

- "Nonlinear-optical informatics"
- "Intelligent optical systems"
- "Nanomaterials and optoelectronic devices"
- "Bioengineering"
- "Nonlinear-optical molecular crystals and microlasers"

== Faculty of International Business and Law ==
The Institute of International Business and Law was established in 2003 and in 2007 it became a Faculty at ITMO. The Faculty originally trained staff for Russia's Federal Customs Service. Now it also trains managers with an emphasis on intellectual property and patents in innovations. It also still offers special courses on customs brokerage. From 2008, the Faculty of International Business and Law collaborates with Rospatent, with the World Intellectual Property Organization (WIPO) and the United Nations Economic Commission for Europe (UNECE).

In 2010 it was accredited by the World Customs Organization (WCO) as an education entity that meets the training standards of the WCO. It's the only organization in Russia that can provide WCO certification. Through its close partnership with WCO it offers a variety of internships, both within the country and abroad.

From 2012, the Faculty functions as Rospatent's Innovation and Technology Support Center. One of the Center's activities is – the "Days of Intellectual Property of the Northwestern Federal District" – a yearly holiday for the World Intellectual Property Day on 26 April.

== Academy "LIMTU" ==
The Leningrad Institute of Management Methods and Techniques (LIMTU) was created in 1969. In 1991, LIMTU was the first educational institution of Leningrad with funding acquired only from commercial activities, not from government budget. From 1993, LIMTU collaborated with the employment Committee of St. Petersburg Government, the Academy was responsible for training unemployed citizens. LIMTU works together with the Committee for labour and social protection of the St. Petersburg Government. Between 2005 and 2014, through a contract with St. Petersburg businesses more than 500 people were taught.

The academy provides a variety of certification and second degree training ranging from management, marketing and accounting to HR, web design and computer graphics. It is also the authorized continued education center for IBM, Microsoft, Novell, Autodesk, D-Link and other companies. The academy is also responsible to ITMO University's distance learning programs.

Since October 2006, the Institute was structured as an academy of ITMO. In 2012, a contract was signed with Franklin University (USA). Students participating in this program receive a certificate from an American university.

== Faculty of Secondary Vocational Education ==
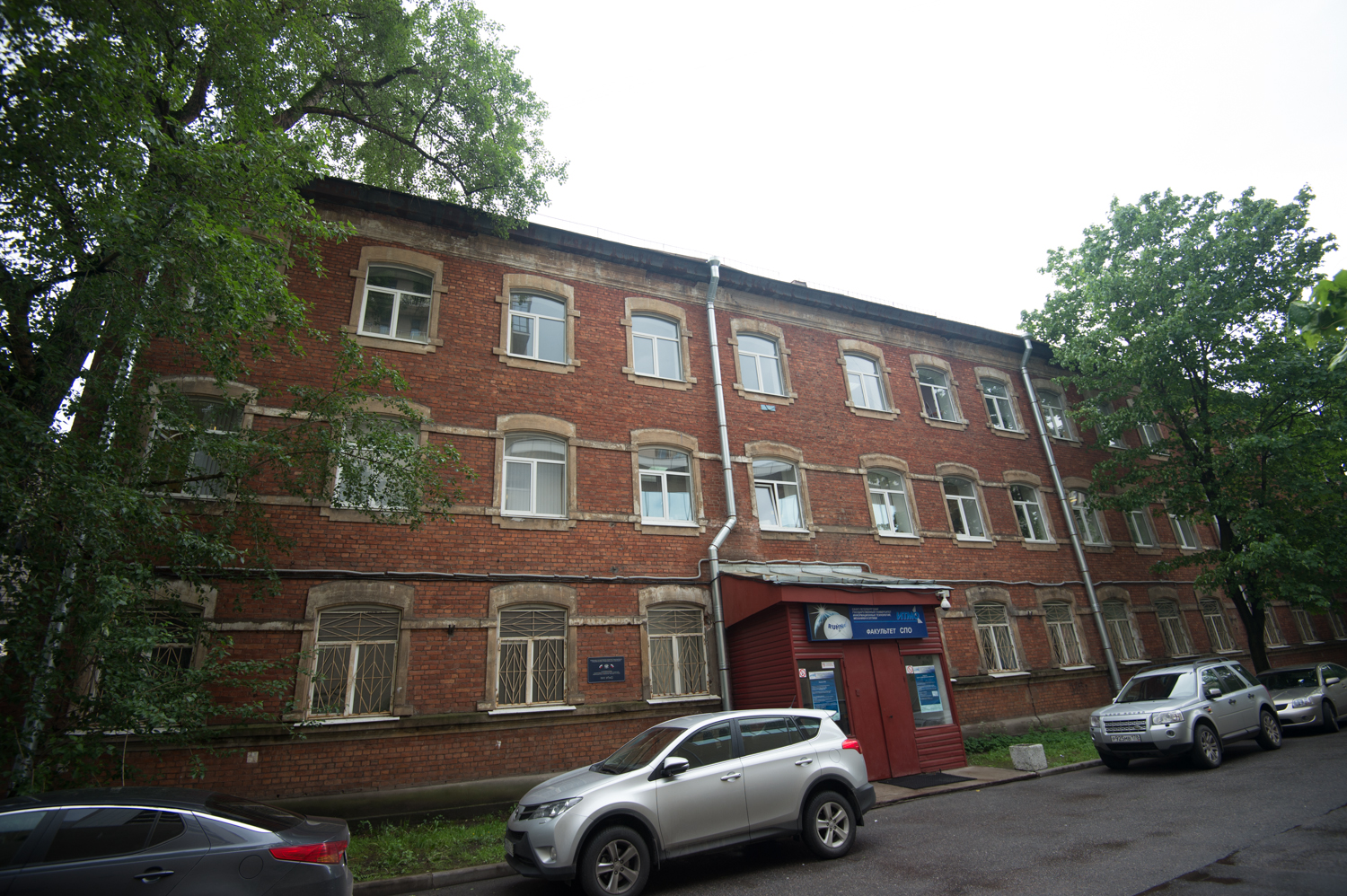
The building on Pesochnaya naberezhnaya

Established in 1945 as a Mechanical Technical School No.1. In 1998, the technical school became a part of ITMO, and in 2003 became a Faculty. This Faculty focuses on specialized professional education programs that start with 9th grade and continue through to Bachelor and Master levels. It also offers preparatory specialized courses for even younger students to help unlock their potential.

== Faculty of Advanced Training of Teachers ==
The Faculty was arranged in LITMO in 1969. This faculty welcomes instructors from around the country interested in pursuing individual training programs in their field. They're paired with ITMO tutors. Training sessions generally last between two and four months.

The Faculty of Advanced Training of Teachers started to use distance learning (e-learning). After each student's starts to prepare an individual plan, a tutor is assigned to them from amongst the Professors at ITMO University. After studying each section of the study material, the students complete self-assessments, and have consultations with their tutors and take examinations. After studying all the proposed courses, the students complete their final work which they must defend at the University where they work.

== Faculty of Higher Qualification Expert Training ==
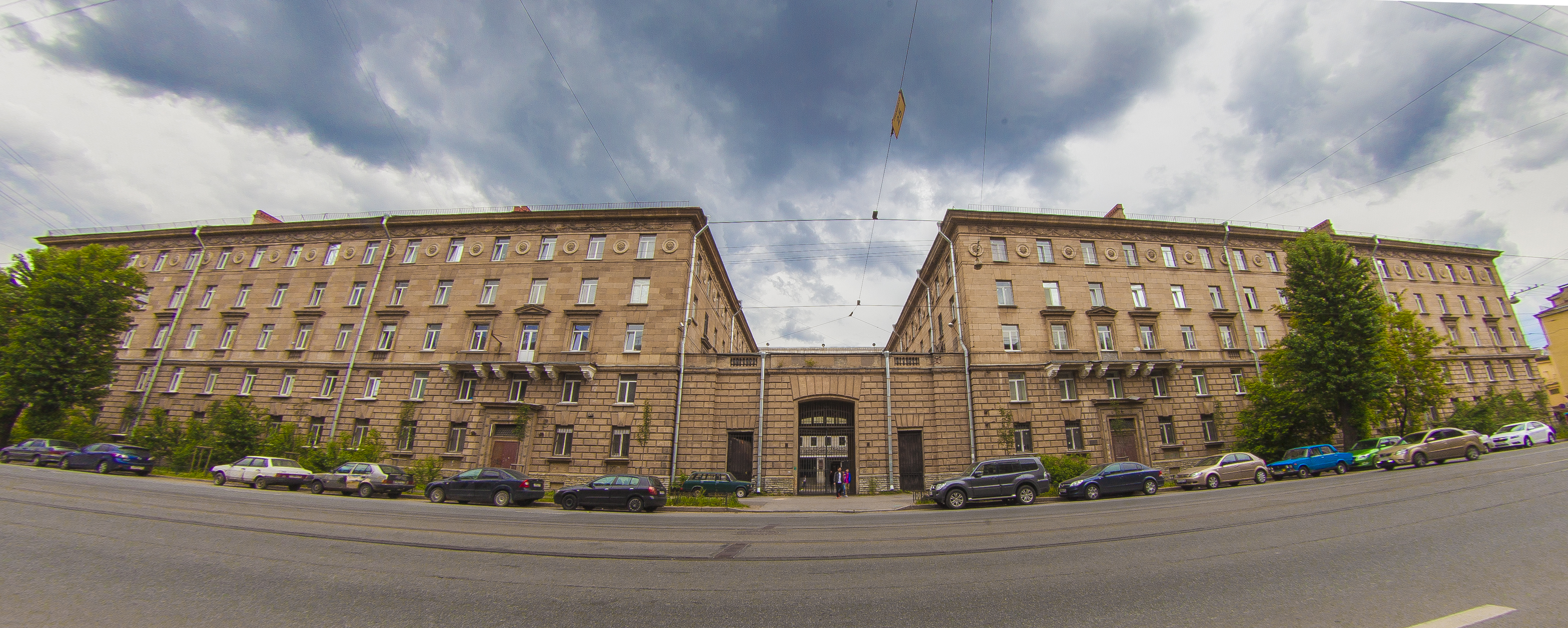
The building on Vyazemskiy per.

The Faculty was established in 2003 as the Faculty of Postgraduate Professional education, it obtained its current title in 2013. This faculty supports graduate and post-graduate students in pursuit of their degrees and collaborates with dissertation councils and other evaluating entities. It also works with foreign universities to establish joint programs, collaborates with the Higher Attestation Commission (VAK), and maintains candidate's documents.

== Faculty of Career Development and Pre-Entry Preparatory Training ==
Established in 2006, this faculty focuses on working with high school students and provides future career counseling, testing, campus tours, short-term and long-term exam preparation courses. The Faculty, together with some nearby schools in St. Petersburg and the Leningrad district has created specialized schools. Training Centers have also opened in establishments within Russia and CIS. Career guidance for school students is carried out through tests, consultations with a psychologist, and excursions to university departments. School students can visit the Departments at ITMO, and study specialized disciplines that aren't offered in the school curriculum.
