= Boris Paykin =

Russian politician

Boris Paykin MP
- Борис Пайкин
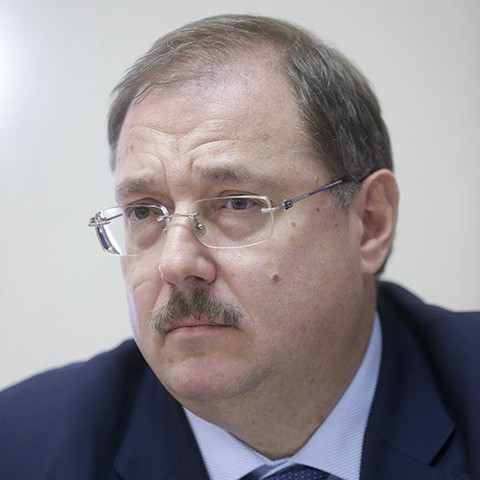

Member of the State Duma (Party List Seat)
- Incumbent
- Assumed office 12 October 2021

Member of the State Duma for Bryansk Oblast
- In office 10 September 2017 – 12 October 2021
- Preceded by: Vladimir Zhutenkov
- Succeeded by: Nikolai Valuev
- Constituency: Bryansk (No. 77)

Personal details
- Born: 26 March 1965 (age 61) Leningrad, RSFSR, USSR
- Party: Liberal Democratic Party of Russia
- Education: St. Petersburg State University of Refrigeration and Food Processing Technologies

Boris Romanovich Paykin (Russian: Борис Романович Пайкин; born 26 March 1965, Leningrad) is a Russian political figure and a deputy of the 8th State Duma.

Starting from the end of the 1980s, Paykin engaged in business. In the mid-1990s, Paykin worked on a voluntary basis as an adviser to the First Deputy of the Governor of Saint Petersburg, Vladimir Yakovlev. From 1996 to 1997, he headed the Petrogradsky District of Saint Petersburg. In 1997, he became the president of the Associations of small and medium businesses of St. Petersburg. In 2006, he headed the Experimental Machine-Building Plant named after. V. M. Myasishcheva. In 2013, Paykin became the president of the FC Tosno. In 2016, he joined the Liberal Democratic Party of Russia. On 10 December 2017 Paykin was elected deputy of the 7th State Duma. Since September 2021, he has served as deputy of the 8th State Duma.

== Sanctions ==
He was sanctioned by the UK government in 2022 in relation to the Russo-Ukrainian War.
