= Michurinsky =

Michurinsky may refer to:

- Michurinsky District, a district of Tambov Oblast, Russia
- Michurinsky Selsoviet, Khabarsky District, Altai Krai, a selsoviet of Khabarsky District of Altai Krai, Russia
- Michurinsky (rural locality) (Michurinskaya, Michurinskoye), several rural localities in Russia

== See also ==
- Michurinsk, a town in Tambov Oblast, Russia
- Michurin (disambiguation)
