= Imperial Commercial College =

Educational institution in Russia

Imperial Commercial College is an educational institution founded in 1772 as part of the Moscow Foundling Home for teaching merchants' children. In 1779 it was named after its founder Prokofi Demidov. In 1800 it was separated from the Home and moved to St. Petersburg. In 1904 it received Imperial status and officially ceased its existence in 1918 but de facto it continued working. In 1931, it served as the foundation for Leningrad Training Mechanics and Technology Refrigeration Plant, which later became the St. Petersburg State University of Refrigeration and Food Processing Technologies.

== History ==
=== 1772–1800, Moscow Period ===
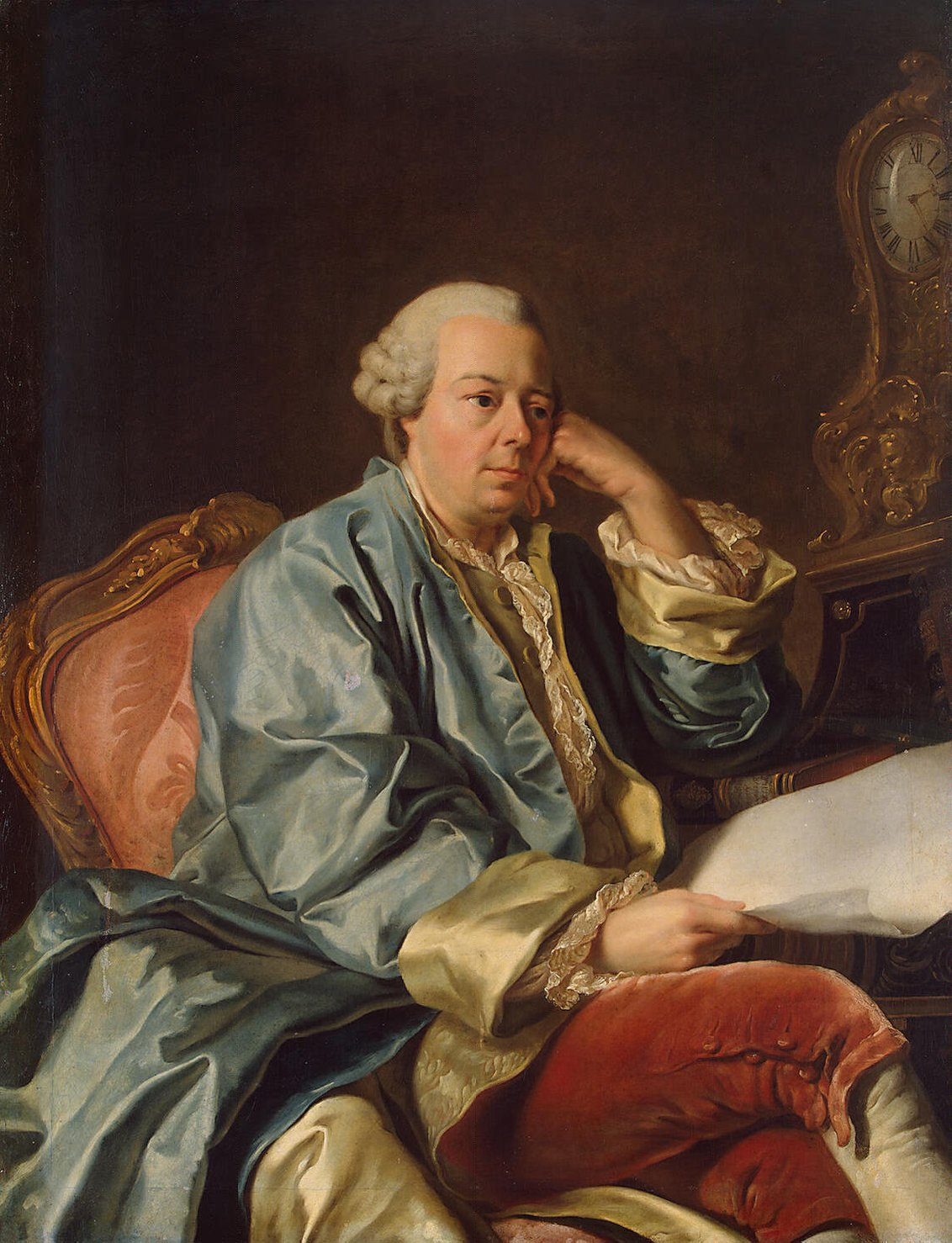
The first director of the College, Ivan Betskoy in 1776–1777

In 1772, Prokofi Akinfiyevich Demidov turned to Catherine II with a suggestion to open as part of the Moscow Foundling Home an "Educational School for Children from Merchant Families for Commerce." A regular donor to the Foundling home, he donated 205,000 rubles for education of merchant children.

Head of the Foundling Home Ivan Betskoy was tasked with developing the curriculum. The top priority was given to shaping students' personalities while obtaining knowledge of commerce came second. On 6 December 1772 the plan was approved, marking the founding date of the school.

Every three years the school accepted six-year-old boys who stayed there till they were of age at 20–21 years old. Education was free. Graduation certificates were given only to those who'd completed to the entire course. At first finding enough students was a challenge, since only merchants' children were accepted. Merchants considered it unprofitable to send away their children for 15 years when could have spent that time teaching them at their own companies.

Ivan Betskoy in 1773 sent to the school from St. Petersburg 17 boys, and the following year came three more. Only seven out of twenty children were merchants, one was the son of a freedman of the peasant, the other were from the petty bourgeoisie. They were mostly orphans who lived with distant relatives. 15 people have completed the course.

Students were divided by age, and each group had its own set of classes with a different number of allocated hours:

- 6–9 year olds – “learning faith,” manners, reading (including in foreign languages,) drawing, dancing, writing and basic counting.
- 9–12 year olds – additional courses included arithmetic, geometry, history, geography, Slavic language, and depending on their talents singing and musical instruments.
- 12–15 year olds – mathematics and mechanics, navigation and seafaring, other languages, speech, accounting, basics of commerce, additional classes such as gardening and home building.
- 15–18 year olds – advanced classes in commerce and accounting, law, economics, arts.
- 18–21 year olds – religion studies, theoretical classes were replaced with internships and first deals.

In 1779 by the order of Catherine II the school was renamed after Demidov and bared its name up until its move to St. Petersburg in 1800.

During the 27 years of the Moscow period, the school had 9 freshmen groups, and out of 239 original students only 46 graduated. Most of them were children of impoverished merchants, but two were children of government officials (in 1779).

The Moscow period was complicated. The students had to share housing facilities with the orphans. Caretakers looked after everybody and there weren’t enough teachers. Periodically teachers from Moscow University showed up but didn't stay long.

After the death of Catherine II in 1796, Pavel I named his wife Maria Fedorovna "Head of the Society for Education of Noble Maidens" and on 2 May 1797 she took over supervision of Moscow and St. Petersburg Foundling homes. Almost instantly she decided to move the Commercial College to St. Petersburg, closer to her, and to separate it from the Home. She also ordered to start its library.

The last Moscow graduation took place in 1799. Graduates got certificates and the more successful ones received medals. Each graduate also was awarded 100 roubles to get started – these moneys up until 1828 were funded personally by the empress Maria Fedorovna.

=== 1800–1917. St. Petersburg Period ===
After moving to St. Petersburg, the College took over the Italian Palace on the Fontanka River and in 1801 it moved to a two-story building on the corner of Zagorodny Prospect and Chernyshov Pereulok.

The College's Council was appointed by the Empress and it was an honor to be invited even if somewhat burdensome. The members were expected not just participate in management but also invest their own funds in repairs, books and general student upkeep. They could only leave the position with an explicit permission by the Empress.

After the move, the directorship was awarded to Vasily Sergeevich Podshivalov. He put together the first documentation about the College.

Starting in 1810, the directorship goes to Karl Karlovich Russau. Without higher education or pedagogical experience, he'd been fired from Preobrazhenski Regiment in the rank of major. He was a rather successful in his position as the director.

From 1818 to 1827 the director was Petr Dmitrievich Lodiy, a lawyer and philosopher. He had previous experience as a director of universities of Lviv and Krakow.

The admission rules also changed at the new location. Now the College accepted 60 boys for free (instead of 100) and the rest had to pay for their tuition. Education lasted six years. From 61 students moved from Moscow, 58 graduated.

The challenging part was the condition of acceptance for free: graduates had to commit to doing commerce for life. Parents signed an agreement that their children would stay in merchants forever, no matter what class they belong to previously. In 1811, the Council turned to Emperor Alexander I with a petition to allow graduates to determine their own choices but only in 1822 the life-long commitment was abolished and changed for a 10-year term for mandatory involvement into any kind of commerce.

The College kept in close contact with the Home, provided boarding for students, but many parents had reservations about letting their children out of their sight for too long. Some of that was because of persisting class differences: as a somewhat charity establishment, the College couldn’t provide any social guarantees for its graduates. But its specialization was training people with European views. It was supported by successful Russian entrepreneurs who thus were raising their future employees.

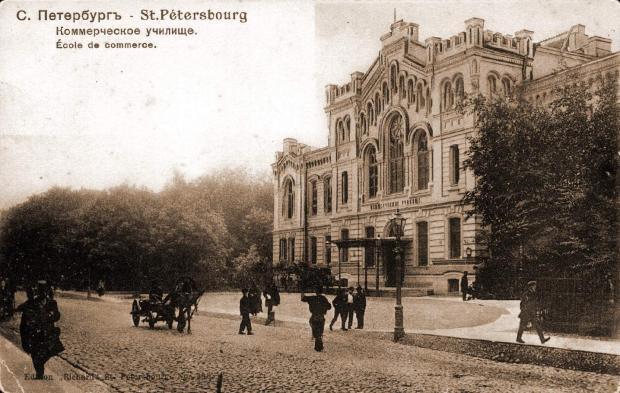
Photo pre-revolutionary building of Imperial Commercial College on Lomonosov st.

In 1834 the number of students reached 200, the staff also grew, and the Council asked Emperor Nikolas I to allow to build a new three-story building on Chernishev Pereulok. It was completed in 1838.

The College had been under the patronage of emperors for a long time and was opposed to moving under the management of the Ministry of National Education, Ministry of Commerce and Ministry of Finance (which in the second half of the 19th century started training staff for its offices in its own commercial colleges not just in the capitals but in smaller towns too.) As the result no ministry could prove the need to restructure the College.

Under the patronage of the state and mostly working with its support, the College was tasked with training business people for the betterment of the country. But still its graduates even with European-quality education could only get mid-range positions in commerce. To start their own businesses they would need startup capital that most of them didn't have. The best group was between 1820 – 1850, when the graduates took positions in joint-stock companies, banks, etc.

In 1841 the position of a director was replaced by a trustee. The first trustee (only for a year) was Prince Oldenburgsky, while patronage remained with Empress Aleskandra Fedorovna, wife of Nikolai I.

That same year, the College also changed its Charter and the length of education. The course lasted seven years and the overall number of subjects was cut from 22 – 29 (depending on age) to 16.

In 1830-40s Russia needed mechanics and engineers, which was reflected in the curriculum. In January 1843, education in the last years was augmented with chemistry, mechanics and drafting. It became mandatory to have an internship both at commercial companies and manufacturing facilities of St. Petersburg.

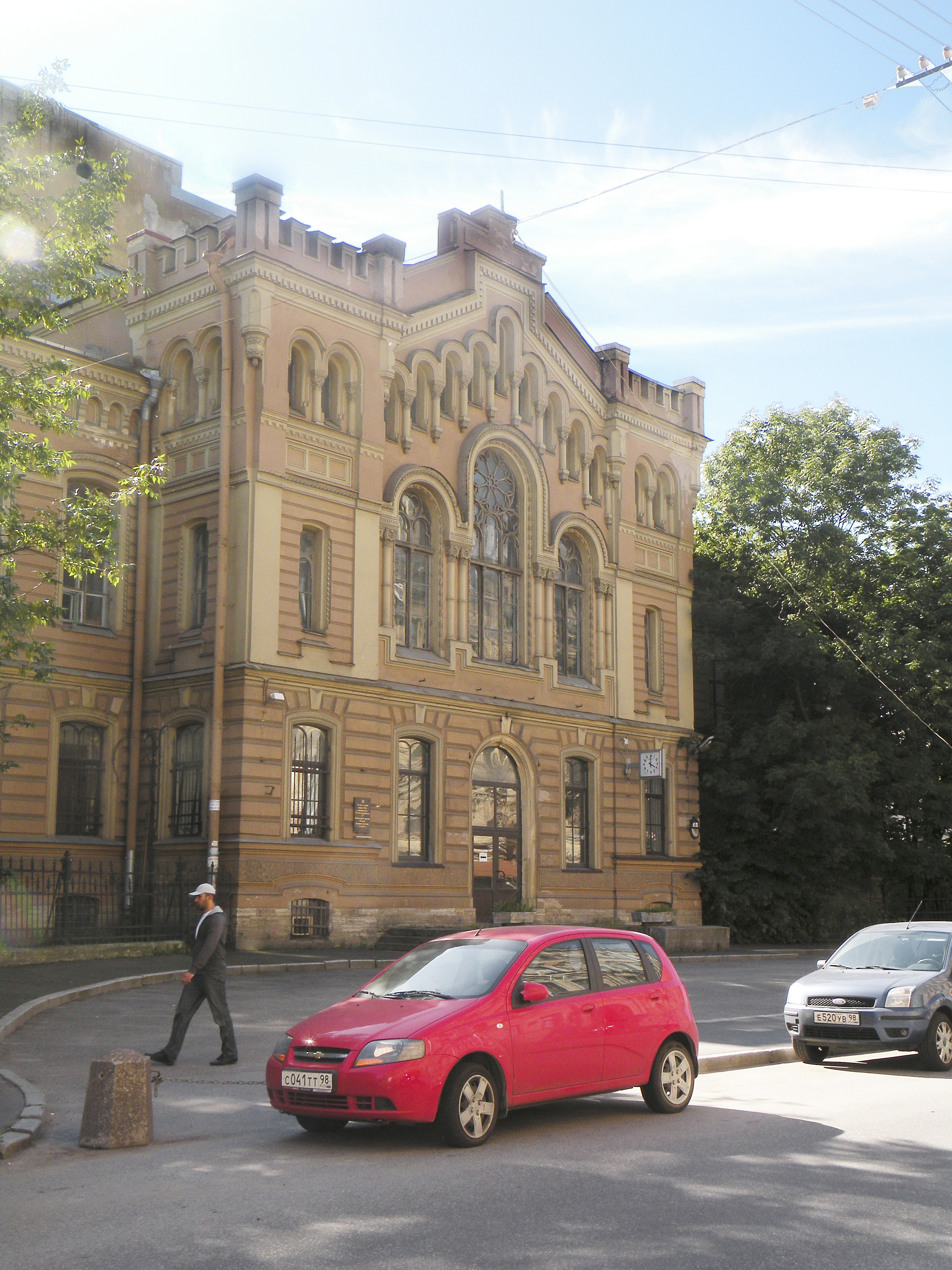
The building today

In 1870–80 Russia experienced a boost that resulted from the abolition of serfdom. After a two-year directorship (1860–1862) by Tibo-Brioniol, the new director (till 1880) became M. Bogoyavlenski. During his tenure the College canceled the mandatory ten-year commitment to commerce after graduation.

The College needed new space. In 1866, a competition was called for projects of a new building. The building in Romanesque style designed by Mikhail Makarov was started in 1869 and finished in 1871. Admissions criteria and curriculum changed once again: now the College accepted 9-10-year-old boys, and the course lasted eight years. The school year for all grades started in the second half of August.

The new curriculum included new classes in engineering and technologies. Students were expected to know about the origins of goods, their chemical and physical characteristics, the level of their quality. In the course on commodities, much time was spent on technologies for processing and storing foodstuffs. Later these courses played an important role in the establishment of the Institute of Refrigeration and Food Processing.

On 14 December 1904 the St. Petersburg Commercial College gained the status of Imperial. Vladimir Aleksandrovich Wagner was its director from 1906 till October Revolution.

Between 1906 and 1910 the number of graduates decreased while the number of teachers increased. By the Civil War the number of students from peasantry. During the War, the budget decreased and there were no more students from the most militarized area of the country – the Don Host Oblast – by January 1917.

In February 1917 Nikolas II renounced the throne. Vladimir Lenin and other Bolsheviks were convinced that specialized commerce education wasn't necessary, The number of commercial establishments was reached 370 by the end of 1917, including schools, trade schools, classes and courses, but the College survived and never stopped classes.

Until June 1918 the College was under the Commission for Social Help of the Petrograd Soviet and on 14 June it was moved to the Commission on Public Education of the Northern Workers. It was said that that year the College seized its existence, but the St. Petersburg Central Historical Archives have documents citing admissions in 1919, 1920 and 1924.

In the early 1920s the building of the College was given to an evening school. In 1931, the Council of People's Commissars of USSR opened in the College's former building a Leningrad Teaching Mechanics and Technology Refrigeration Plant that became the State University of Refrigeration and Food Processing Technologies. It lasted for 80 years and in 2011 was joined with ITMO University. The building for the plant was a nod to the old Commercial College, which was among the few institutions in pre-revolutionary Russia to train specialists in refrigeration.
