= Suponevo =

Suponevo (Russian: Супонево) may refer to several populated places in Russia:

- Suponevo, Bryansk Oblast
- Suponevo, Odinstovsky District, Moscow Oblast
- Suponevo, Samara Oblast

== See also ==
- Suponev
