= Vasily Shandybin =

Russian politician

- Василий Шандыбин
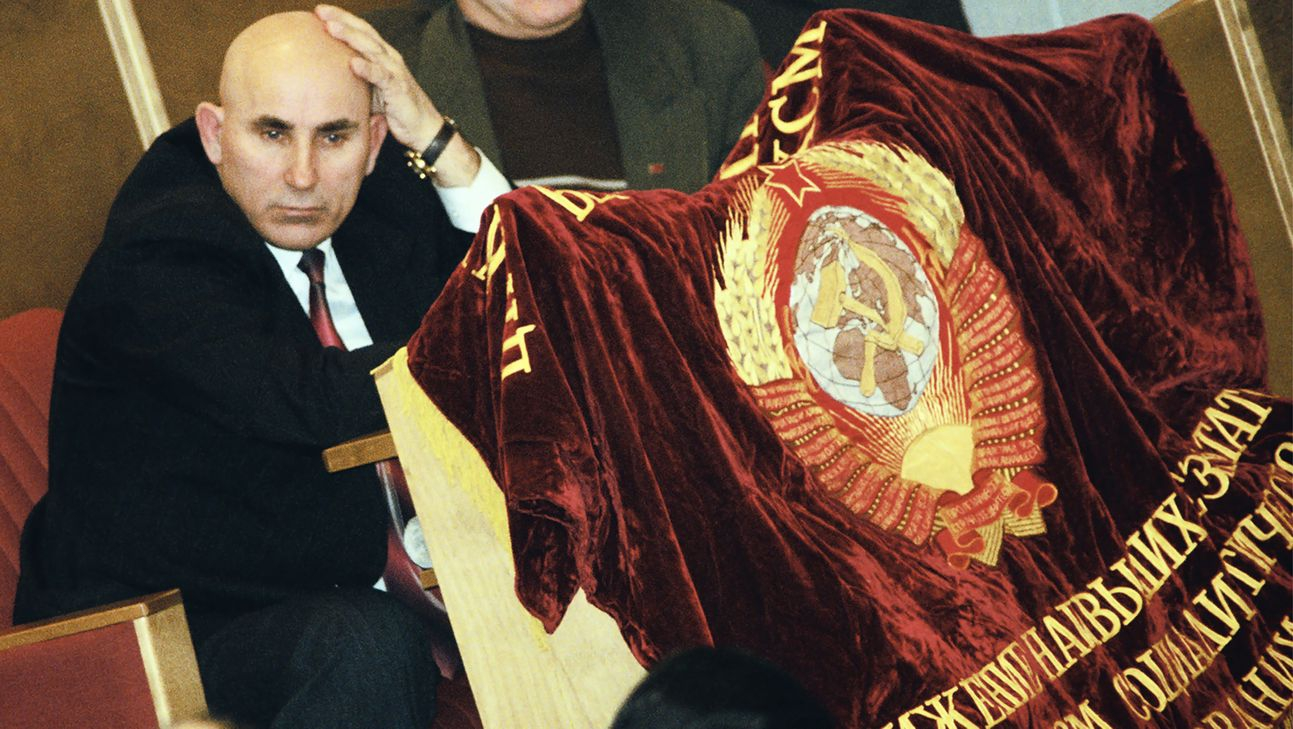

Member of the State Duma from Bryansk Oblast's Bryansk constituency
- In office 17 December 1995 – 29 December 2003
- Preceded by: Anatoly Vorontsov
- Succeeded by: Nikolay Denin

Personal details
- Born: 25 July 1941 Tyomnoye, Russian SFSR, Soviet Union
- Died: 30 December 2009 (aged 68) Moscow, Russia
- Party: APR (2007–2009)
- Other political affiliations: CPRF (1993–2007); CPSU (1970–1991)
- Children: 2

Vasily Ivanovich Shandybin (Russian: Василий Иванович Шандыбин; 25 July 1941 – 30 December 2009) was a Russian politician. He was a member of State Duma representing the Communist Party of the Russian Federation until 2003. He failed to get re-elected and subsequently joined the Agrarian Party of Russia, intending to run at the next elections.

Shandybin was a former metalworker and was well known for his bald head and his frank manners. Shandybin was involved in many charitable activities in favour of orphans asylum, poor people, schools and pensioners.

== Biography ==
=== Early life and career ===
Vasily Ivanovich Shandybin was born on 25 July 1941 in large suburban Tyomnoye village (now Krasnoye village, Trubchevsky District, Bryansk Oblast. He received secondary general and secondary special technical education. Shandybin started his work life on the oldest industrial enterprise in Bryansk - Bryansk Road Building Machinery Plant ("Dormash", now CJSC "Bryansk Arsenal"). Shandybin worked as locksmith for 34 years up until his election to State Duma.

Shandybin actively participated in plant's community life. For his successful and skilled work Shandybin received numerous governmental and ministerial honors.

=== State Duma member ===
In 1994 Shandybin was elected to the Bryansk Oblast Duma. In 1995 Shandybin was nominated by CPRF to run in an open-seat contest in Bryansk constituency No.64. Shandybin won the election with 32.26% of the vote trouncing his nearest opponent by 22 points. In State Duma Shandybin was appointed to the Committee on Veterans' Affairs, but since April 1996 he served in Committee on Labour and Social Policy.

In 1999 Shandybin won re-election to State Duma with 36.59%, easily defeating his opponents - “Snezhka” poultry factory director Nikolay Denin (Independent, 17.73%) and fellow State Duma member Lyudmila Narusova (Independent, 5.90%), wife of former Saint Petersburg Mayor Anatoly Sobchak. In State Duma Shandybin was first appointed to the Committee on Energy, Transport, and Communications, and later to the Committee on Property Issues.

In 2000 Shandybin was rumoured to run for Governor of Bryansk Oblast, but he ultimately declined endorsing incumbent Communist Governor Yury Lodkin.

In 2003 election Shandybin lost his seat in a rematch against Nikolay Denin (United Russia) by a 32-25 margin. Much to the Shandybin defeat contributed Russian-wide popularity of United Russia and Governor Lodkin's support of Ivan Fedotkin (URF) and Gennady Seleznyov’s Party of Russia's Rebirth. Soon after the election Shandybin announced he was planning to return to State Duma running in 2004 Ulyanovsk by-election. However, he ran in Verkh-Isetsky constituency №162 but lost to former State Duma member Yevgeny Zyablitsev, winning only 8.80%. After his departure from State Duma Shandybin was appointed as Central Committee of CPRF consultant for labour movement and union activity.

=== Later political career ===
In upcoming 2004 Bryansk Oblast Duma elections CPRF and APR decided to form a single electoral bloc - "CPRF-APR-For the Victory!". Shandybin was invited to join the bloc list and also to run in a single-mandate constituency, but he declined to join the bloc list if it was going to be headed by Governor Yury Lodkin accusing the latter of mismanagement and Bryansk Machine-Building Plant forced bankruptcy. Governor Lodkin accused Shandybin of preparing to run against him in upcoming gubernatorial election (Shandybin considered running for Governor in 2004 but later endorsed Yury Lodkin). Nevertheless, Shandybin ran for Bryansk Oblast Duma in one of metropolitan Bryansk single-mandate constituencies but lost in an upset. Yury Lodkin also lost the governorship after being disqualified from the ballot by Bryansk Oblast Court.

Shandybin twice tried to reclaim his old seat in State Duma by running in both 2005 and 2006 by-elections after Nikolay Denin was elected as Governor of Bryansk Oblast. In 2005 Shandybin ran as Independent but he was disqualified by the Supreme Court for residency controversy. The results of the 2005 by-election, which was won by Vice-Governor Viktor Malashenko (United Russia), were annulled due to low turnout, so another by-election was scheduled for 12 March 2006. Shandybin for the second time ran as an Independent in 2006 by-election but 5 days before the by-election Shandybin and 2 other candidates withdrew from the race leaving Viktor Malashenko the sole candidate in an attempt to postpone the by-election for the second time. However, LDPR leader Vladimir Zhirinovsky personally visited Bryansk to convince party candidate Valery Khramchenkov return to the race which he did. Shandybin accused Zhirinovsky and local militsiya of severe beating of Khramchenkov to force him to cancel his withdrawal. Viktor Malashenko defeated Valery Khramchenkov on 12 March retaining the seat for United Russia.

Shandybin left CPRF in 2007. Shandybin took part in 2007 State Duma election as No.3 in Agrarian Party of Russia federal party list (he was placed behind party leader Vladimir Plotnikov and milkmaid Nina Brusnikova). APR took only 2.30% in the general election and failed to win any seats in State Duma.

In 2008 Shandybin unsuccessfully tried to take his old job as a locksmith. He also was planning to run for Head of Selizharovsky District (Tver Oblast) as A Just Russia candidate.

=== Death ===
On 18 December 2009 Shandybin was hospitalised at Central Clinical Hospital for stomach polyp removal.

12 days later, on 30 December 2009 at 2:30 am Shandybin died at the age of 68. The preliminary cause of death was thrombosis. Shandybin was buried in Mitinskoe Cemetery on 3 January 2010.

== Incidents in State Duma ==
Shandybin was well known for his frank manners and impulsive behaviour. There were several incidents in State Duma when Shandybin physically or verbally abused fellow State Duma members.

- 31 March 1999 – Independent liberal MP Sergey Yushenkov during his speech called Communist MP Vladimir Semago a "political prostitute". The latter MP got to the rostrum and tried to drag down Yushenkov. Shandybin rushed to help Semago. The fighting MPs had to be physically separated by Speaker Gennady Seleznyov.
- 31 March 2000 – Shandybin verbally attacked Vice-Speaker Lyubov Sliska alleging her election to State Duma as a favour from Saratov Oblast Governor Dmitry Ayatskov for intimate relations between them. Shandybin was censured for a month.
- 28 January 2001 – Shandybin proposed sending MPs who boycotted parliamentary sessions to remove snow from the streets.
- 7 February 2003 – Independent MP Aleksandr Fedulov called CPRF leader Gennady Zyuganov a "political prostitute". Shandybin approached Fedulov and pushed him.

== Personal life ==
Shandybin was married and had two children. He was into playing pool (some report he "maniacally" loved the game). Shandybin called himself "Doctor of Work Sciences".

Shandybin had a cameo in fantasy film Day Watch.

== See also ==
- Communist Party of the Russian Federation
- Agrarian Party of Russia
- History of post-Soviet Russia
- Politics of post-Soviet Russia
