= Kokino, Komarichsky District, Bryansk Oblast =

Kokino Кокино
- Village
- Location within Bryansk Oblast Location within Russia
- Coordinates: 52°29′N 34°46′E
- Country: Russia
- Region: Bryansk Oblast
- District: Komarichsky District
- Time zone: UTC+3:00

Kokino (Russian: Ко́кино) is a rural locality (a village) in Komarichsky District, Bryansk Oblast, Russia. The population was 461 as of 2010. There are 3 streets.

== Geography ==
Kokino is located 9 km north of Komarichi (the district's administrative centre) by road. Radogoshch is the nearest rural locality.
