= Putyovka =

Putyovka Путёвка
- Settlement
- Location within Bryansk Oblast Location within Russia
- Coordinates: 53°15′N 34°17′E
- Country: Russia
- Region: Bryansk Oblast
- District: Bryansky District
- Time zone: UTC+3:00

Putyovka (Russian: Путёвка) is a rural locality (a settlement) in Bryansky District, Bryansk Oblast, Russia. Population: 8,985 (2021 census); 4,736 (2010). There are 73 streets.

== Geography ==
Putyovka is located 16 km southeast of Glinishchevo (the district's administrative centre) by road. Kuzmino is the nearest rural locality.
