= Kirsha Danilov =

Supposed compiler of Russian folksongs

- Known for: Compiling a collection of Russian heroic, religious and humorous folksongs

Kirsha Danilov (Russian: Кирша Данилов) was the supposed compiler of a collection of Russian heroic, religious and humorous folksongs that made its first appearance in print in 1804. The anthology is entitled The Ancient Russian Poems and includes 71 texts set down in manuscript in the mid-18th century, probably in the Urals. It was one of the first authentic collections of folksongs to be published in Europe. The original manuscript was owned by industrialist Prokofi Demidov and is kept in the Russian National Library in St Petersburg.

Nothing is known about Kirsha Danilov. His first name is the diminutive of "Cyril". The name is written on the manuscript, but may be fictitious. His collection proved very popular with a literate public whose patriotic feelings and interest in the national history were awoken by Napoleon's invasion and Karamzin's research. An extended edition with melodies was prepared by Konstantin Kalaidovich at the bidding of Count Rumyantsev in 1818. Several obscene songs from Kirsha's collection were not published until the 20th century.
