= Michurinskoye, Altai Krai =

Michurinskoye Мичуринское
- Selo
- Location within Altai Krai Location within Russia
- Coordinates: 53°28′N 79°44′E
- Country: Russia
- Region: Altai Krai
- District: Khabarsky District
- Time zone: UTC+7:00

Michurinskoye (Russian: Мичуринское) is a rural locality (a selo) and the administrative center of Michurinsky Selsoviet, Khabarsky District, Altai Krai, Russia. The population was 848 as of 2013. There are 10 streets.

== Geography ==
Michurinskoye is located 31 km southeast of Khabary (the district's administrative centre) by road. Novoplotava is the nearest rural locality.
