= Nikolai Shcheglov =

Russian politician (born 1960)

- Николай Щеглов

Deputy of the 8th State Duma
- Incumbent
- Assumed office 19 September 2021

Personal details
- Born: 16 March 1960 (age 66) Trubchevsk, Bryansk Oblast, Russian Soviet Federative Socialist Republic, USSR
- Party: United Russia
- Education: Smolensk State Medical University

Nikolay Shcheglov (Russian: Николай Михайлович Щеглов; March 16, 1960, Trubchevsk, Bryansk Oblast) is a Russian political figure and deputy of the 8th State Duma. In 2012, he was granted a Candidate of Sciences Degree in Medicine.

From 1985 to 2003, Shcheglov worked as an emergency surgeon in the second surgical department of the Bryansk city hospital. From 2003 to 2015, he was the chief physician of the Bryansk Central District Hospital. From December 2015 to September 2021, Shcheglov was the Deputy Governor of the Bryansk Oblast. Since September 2021, he has served as deputy of the 8th State Duma.

In 2021, Shcheglov became 22nd on the list of 100 most influential people of the Bryansk Oblast.

== Sanctions ==
He was sanctioned by the UK government in 2022 in relation to the Russo-Ukrainian War.

He is one of the members of the State Duma the United States Treasury sanctioned on 24 March 2022 in response to the 2022 Russian invasion of Ukraine.
