= Michurinsky, Altai Krai =

Michurinsky Мичуринский
- Settlement
- Location within Altai Krai Location within Russia
- Coordinates: 51°27′N 81°09′E
- Country: Russia
- Region: Altai Krai
- District: Rubtsovsky District
- Time zone: UTC+7:00

Michurinsky (Russian: Мичуринский) is a rural locality (a settlement) in Rubtsovsky Selsoviet, Rubtsovsky District, Altai Krai, Russia. The population was 477 as of 2013. There are 4 streets.

== Geography ==
Michurinsky is located 7 km southwest of Rubtsovsk (the district's administrative centre) by road. Zelyonaya Dubrava is the nearest rural locality.
