= Michurinsky, Bryansk Oblast =

Michurinsky Мичуринский
- Settlement
- Location within Bryansk Oblast Location within Russia
- Coordinates: 53°16′N 34°14′E
- Country: Russia
- Region: Bryansk Oblast
- District: Bryansky District
- Time zone: UTC+3:00

Michurinsky (Russian: Мичуринский) is a rural locality (a settlement) and the administrative center of Michurinskoye Rural Settlement, Bryansky District, Bryansk Oblast, Russia. Population: 4,525 (2021 census); 2,576 (2010). There are 57 streets.

== Geography ==
Michurinsky is located 12 km east of Glinishchevo (the district's administrative centre) by road. Tolmachevo is the nearest rural locality.
