= Michurinsky, Volgograd Oblast =

Michurinsky Мичуринский
- Settlement
- Location within Volgograd Oblast Location within Russia
- Coordinates: 50°07′N 45°24′E
- Country: Russia
- Region: Volgograd Oblast
- District: Kamyshinsky District
- Time zone: UTC+4:00

Michurinsky (Russian: Мичуринский) is a rural locality (a settlement) and the administrative center of Michurinskoye Rural Settlement, Kamyshinsky District, Volgograd Oblast, Russia. The population was 2,276 as of 2010. There are 14 streets.

== Geography ==
Michurinsky is located in forest steppe, on the Volga Upland, 7 km north of Kamyshin (the district's administrative centre) by road. Torpovka is the nearest rural locality.
