= Michurinsky, Belgorod Oblast =

Michurinsky Мичуринский
- Settlement
- Location within Belgorod Oblast Location within Russia
- Coordinates: 50°40′N 37°17′E
- Country: Russia
- Region: Belgorod Oblast
- District: Korochansky District
- Time zone: UTC+3:00

Michurinsky (Russian: Мичуринский) is a rural locality (a settlement) in Korochansky District, Belgorod Oblast, Russia. The population was 275 as of 2010. There is 1 street.

== Geography ==
Michurinsky is located 24 km southeast of Korocha (the district's administrative centre) by road. Novy Put is the nearest rural locality.
