= Kokino, Vygonichsky District, Bryansk Oblast =

Kokino Кокино
- Selo
- Interactive map of Kokino
- Location of Kokino Kokino (Bryansk Oblast)
- Coordinates: 53°09′19″N 34°07′14″E
- Country: Russia
- Federal subject: Bryansk Oblast

Population (2010 Census)
  - Total: 3,863
  - Estimate (2021): 3,008 (−22.1%)
- Time zone: UTC+3 (MSK)
- Postal code: 243365
- OKTMO ID: 15610415101

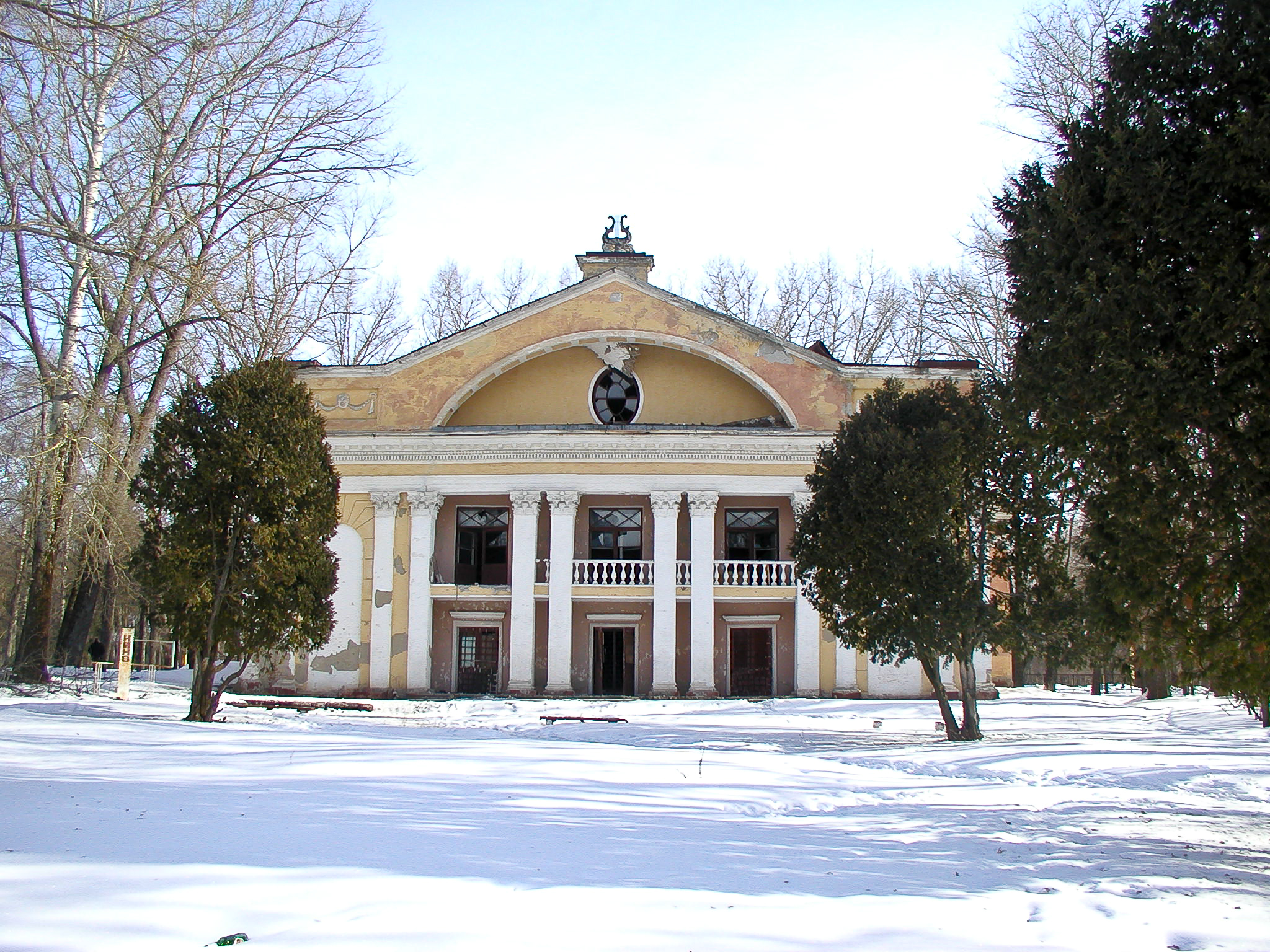
Old recreation center

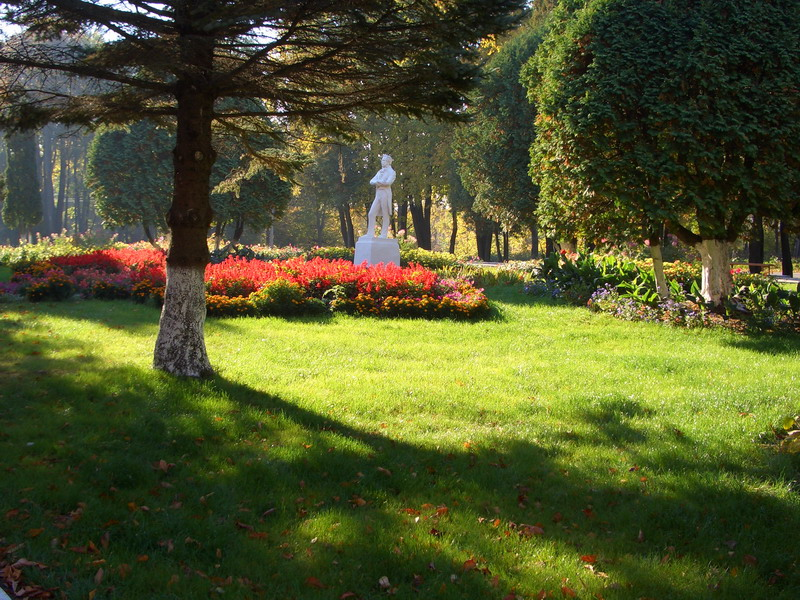
Kokino Park

Kokino (Russian: Кокино) is a rural locality (a selo) in Vygonichsky District of Bryansk Oblast, Russia, located 23 kilometers (14 mi) from Bryansk and 2 kilometers (1.2 mi) from the federal highway M13 (ru). Population: 3,008 (2021 census); 3,863 (2010 census); 4,710 (2002 census).

== History ==
The Slavic population appeared in this region by the 9th century. However, surrounding villages in the area of Kokino are only mentioned historically from the beginning of the 17th century. The first mention of Kokino was in 1610, when Bryansk nobleman Vasily Tyutchev was granted an estate that included Kokino and a number of villages. A wooden church and a manor house were built.

The last owner was pomeshchitsa Varvara Nikolayevna Bezobrazova. After her death in 1828, because of lack of heirs, the estate was given in custody, and later sold. In 1830, the estate passed into the possession of Lieutenant Colonel P. D. Khalayev. The last landlord was Trubchevsk county marshal of the nobility N. N. Khalayev.

In 1930, Kokino Church of the Intercession was closed and converted into a club. In 1938, priest Andrey Pokrovsky was arrested. After the war the church was dismantled, crypts were destroyed, and the cemetery around the church demolished. Currently on the site of the temple is a monument to Lenin.

== Economy ==
The largest employer organization in Kokino is the BSAA. Some 344 teachers are employed in this educational institution. The village has some small shops, marketing mainly food and household chemicals, it also has a small market.

=== Transportation ===
Kokino is connected to Bryansk with municipal buses and private taxis with an interval of about twenty minutes.

== Education ==
A school in Kokino was founded in 1876. In 1906, a new manor house (now the Education Building #4 BSAA) was erected. The Bryansk State Agricultural Academy (BSAA) institution was established on October 1, 1930. In the 1980s, it was known as Bryansk Agricultural Institute and renamed in 1995. The institute has a notable library of some 410,000 volumes.
