= St. Petersburg State University of Refrigeration and Food Processing Technologies =

- Санкт-Петербургский государственный университет низкотемпературных и пищевых технологий
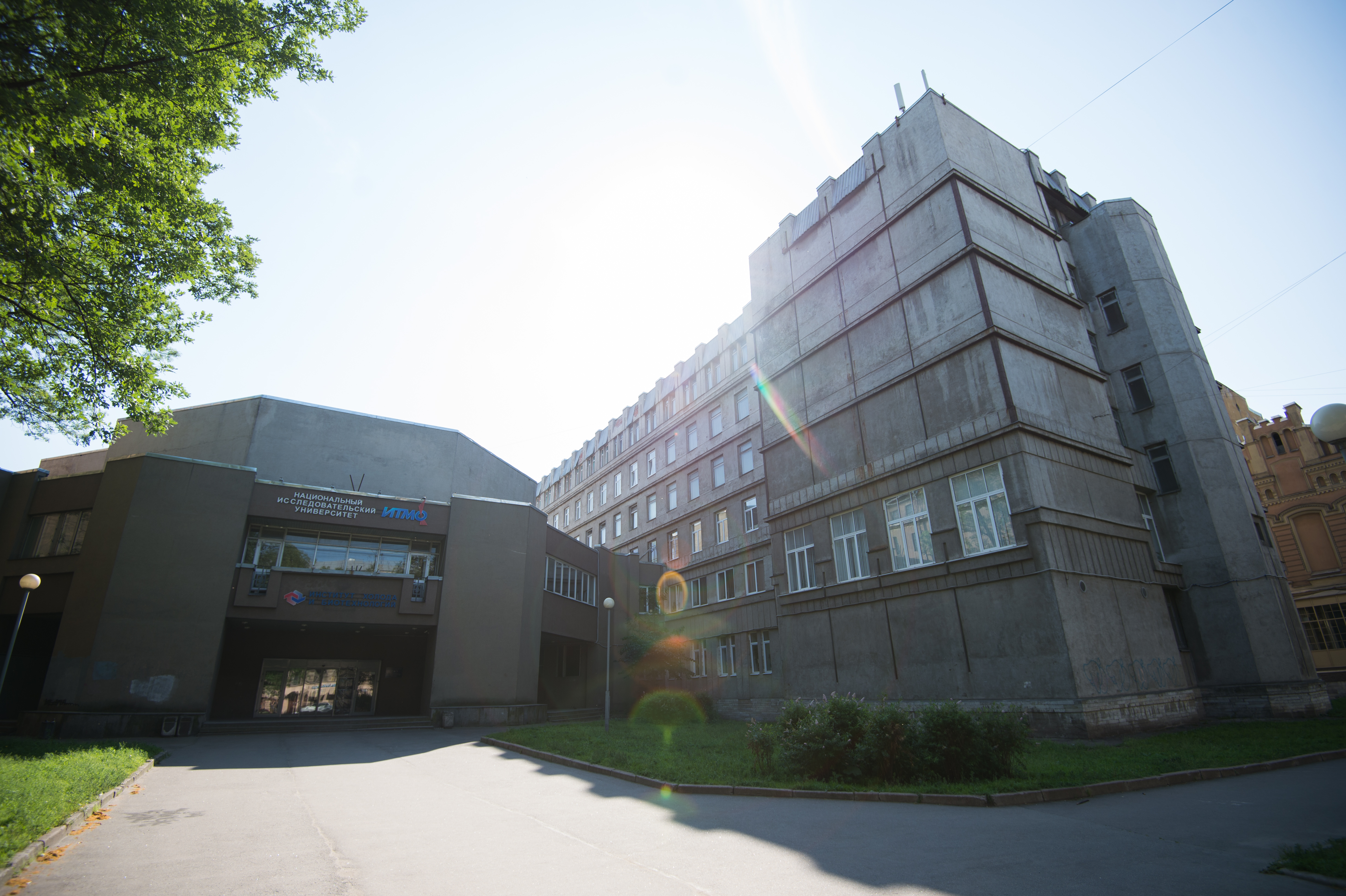
- Type: Public
- Established: 1931-2011
- Students: 6'500 (2011)
- Location: Saint Petersburg, Russia
- Campus: Urban
- Website: Department of Food Biotechnologies and Engineering and Department of Cryogenic Techniques and Air Conditioning

St. Petersburg State University of Refrigeration and Food Processing Technologies was a state university in Saint Petersburg, Russia.

It was founded in 1931 and based on the Imperial Commercial College which was established in 1772. In 2011, the University with its six departments merged with ITMO University as Institute of Refrigeration and Biotechnologies. At the time it had 6,500 students and 82 instructors. In 2015 it was transformed into the Department of Cryogenic Techniques and Air Conditioning and Department of Food Biotechnologies and Engineering of ITMO University.

== History ==
=== Commercial College ===
1772 – 1918

In 1772, Prokofi Akinfiyevich Demidov turned to Catherine II with a suggestion to open as part of the Moscow Foundling Home an “Educational School for Children from Merchant Families for Commerce.” A regular donor to the Foundling home, he donated 205,000 rubles for education of merchant children. On Dec. 6, 1772 the academic plan was approved, marking the founding date of the school.

In 1779 by the order of Catherine II the school was renamed after Demidov and bared its name up until its move to St. Petersburg in 1800.

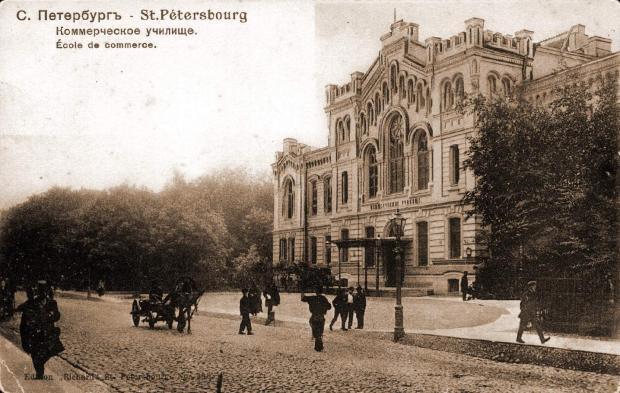
Photo pre-revolutionary building of Imperial Commercial College on Lomonosov st.

After the death of Catherine II in 1796, Pavel I named his wife Maria Fedorovna “Head of the Society for Education of Noble Maidens” and on May 2, 1797 she took over supervision of Moscow and St. Petersburg Foundling homes. Almost instantly she decided to move the Commercial College to St. Petersburg, closer to her, and to separate it from the Home.

In 1830-40's Russia needed mechanics and engineers, which was reflected in the curriculum. In January 1843, education in the last years was augmented with chemistry, mechanics and drafting. It became mandatory to have an internship both at commercial companies and manufacturing facilities of St. Petersburg. In 1870-80 Russia experienced a boost that resulted from the abolition of serfdom. The College's new curriculum included new classes in engineering and technologies. Students were expected to know about the origins of goods, their chemical and physical characteristics, the level of their quality. In the course on commodities, much time was spent on technologies for processing and storing foodstuffs. Later these courses played an important role in the establishment of the Institute of Refrigeration and Food Processing.

On Dec. 14, 1904 the St. Petersburg Commercial College gained the status of Imperial.

In February 1917 Nikolas II renounced the throne. Until June 1918 the College was under the Commission for Social Help of the Petrograd Labor Commune and on June 14 it was moved to the Commission on Public Education of the Northern Labor Commune. It was said that that year the College seized its existence, but the St. Petersburg Central Historical Archives have documents citing admissions in 1919, 1920 and 1924.

=== University of Refrigeration and Food Processing Technologies ===
==== 1931 – 1941 ====
In 1931, the Council of People's Commissars of USSR opened in the College's former building a Leningrad Teaching Mechanics and Technology Refrigeration Plant. It took over the building erected in 1871 for the 100th anniversary of the Commercial College. Over 440 students started classes in the fall of 1931.

In pre-revolutionary Russia, several institutes taught classes for the specialists in refrigeration, including St. Petersburg Technical Institute, St. Petersburg Polytechnic, Kiev Polytechnic and Tomsk Polytechnic Institutes, Imperial Technical College and St. Petersburg Imperial Commercial College. In 1930, some 100 specialists graduated in USSR.

An important role in the establishment of the Mechanics and Technology Refrigeration Plant was played by Anastas Mikoyan. The new college united the institute and rabfak, a preparatory department for workers. In 1934 rabfak and the institute became separate entities, and the college was renamed the Leningrad Institute of Refrigeration. In 1938 it also started training specialists in dairy processing.

==== 1941 – 1945 ====
On June 24, 1941, a group of students was sent to build an air strip. The next day, a mobile unit was formed to fight saboteurs and four days later it joined the Frunze volunteer brigade. The Institute housed the headquarters for the 1st Infantry Regiment, 3rd Division of the People's Militia of the Frunze District.

During the war, students and instructors dug trenches, fought on the front lines and protected the building from lighting bombs and shells. The institute developed synthetic fuel for tanks and for engines in low temperatures, isothermal container for transporting blood, refrigeration unit for testing samples of military equipment, soy milk production and fish canning, flour substitutions. In 1942 it was evacuated to Kislovodsk, then to Semipalatinsk, where it stayed till 1944. Classes continued during the war. Between 1941 and 1947, some 1,462 engineers graduated.

==== 1945 – 2011 ====
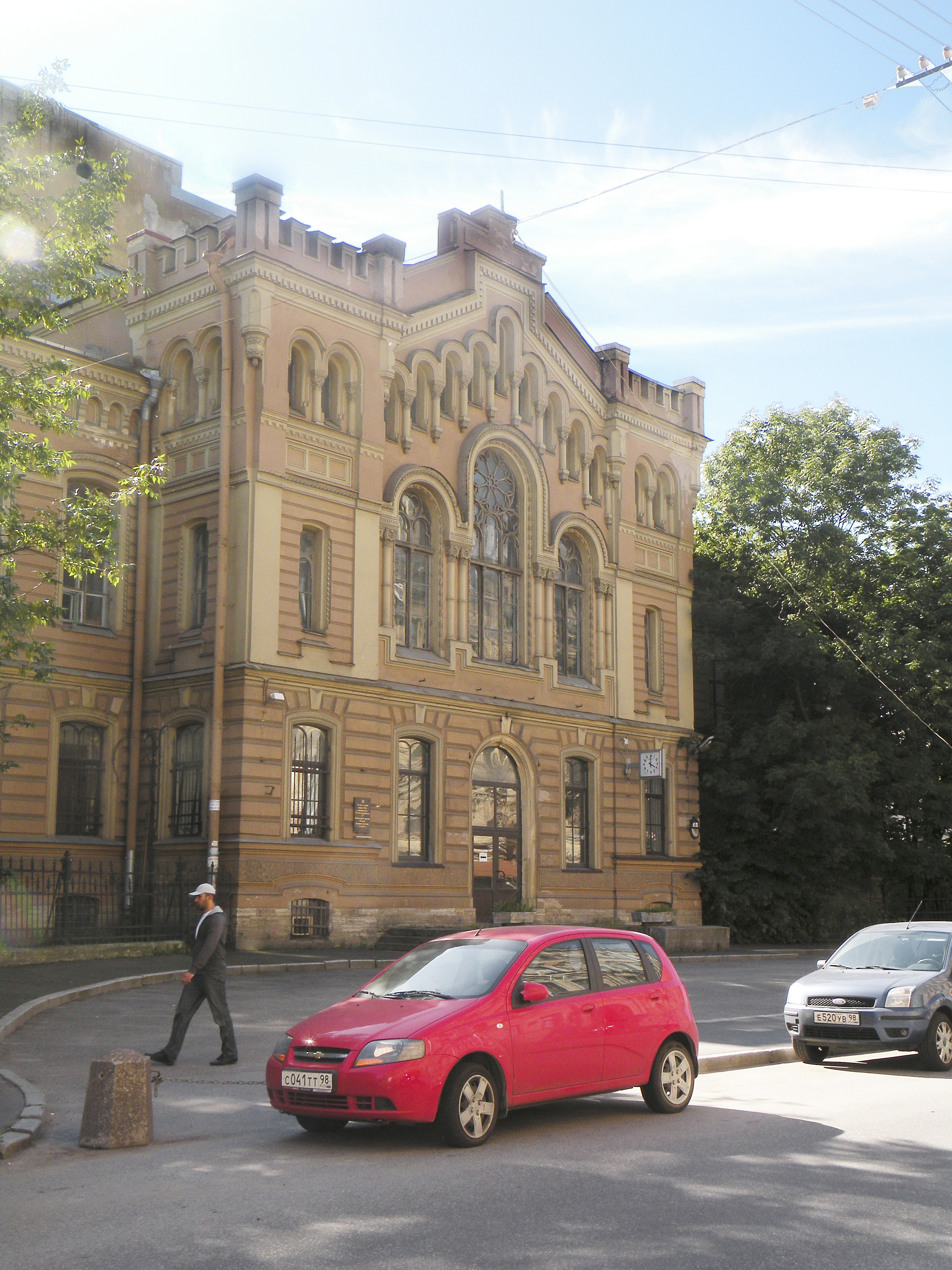
The building today

The boost of food processing during the Stalin years led to high demand in the new equipment for meat, dairy, fish and other industries. Also, the university's refrigeration units were used for freezing the soil when building tunnels for Moscow and Leningrad Metro.

In 1947 Mechanics and Technology Refrigeration Plant and the Leningrad Chemical and Technology Institute of Dairy Processing were united into the Leningrad Institute of Refrigeration and Dairy Processing. It was formed with two departments: mechanical and technological. In 1949 it they were joined by the Refrigeration Department. In 1953 the institute was renamed Leningrad Technological Institute of Refrigeration. From 1957 to 1993 it had an evening school, and from 1966 offered a correspondence course. In 1975 three departments were added: refrigeration equipment, cryo equipment and air conditioning. In 1980 the departments of cryo equipment and air conditioning were united into one.

In 1991 the institute was renamed St. Petersburg Red Banner Technological Institute of Refrigeration, and in 1993 – St. Petersburg Technological Institute of Refrigeration. In 1994 it became St. Petersburg State Academy of Refrigeration and Food Processing and in 1999 it became St. Petersburg State University of Low-Temperature and Food Processing Technologies.

Educational Process

In 1997 the college started training specialists in meat processing and in 2002 got the license to teach Food Biotechnologies and Environmental Protection and Resources Management. The results of its research were used in constructing Krasnoyarsk Dam, Sayano-Shushenskaya Dam and Angara hydroelectric plants.

In 2003 it was one of the most in-demand colleges with 2,14 people per place.

It had over 170 contracts with companies in St. Petersburg, Leningrad region and other regions. Students interned at Baltika Brewing Company, Norilsk Nickel, BSH Hausgeräte, several meat-packing plant like Parnas-M, and others.

In 2011 it had over 6,500 students. During the 80 years of its existence it trained over 43,000 specialists.

=== Merging with ITMO University ===
President Vladimir Putin, in his order on May 7, 2012, started a college reform where certain colleges were merged to improve their effectiveness. Thus on Aug. 18, 2011, the university joined with ITMO University, and all the students, with their approval, transferred to ITMO.

Staff of merging colleges must jointly assess the strengths and weaknesses of the merger, evaluate the risks and make the process as painless as possible. The main goal of the process is concentrating the resources: technical, material and intellectual. It will create a breakthrough in interdisciplinary research, which has been the case for ITMO University and the University of Low-Temperature Technologies.

— Vladimir Vasilyev, ITMO University Rector. Teacher's Newspaper (2012)

Originally the college kept its departments and was named the Institute of Refrigeration and Biotechnologies. The Institute's rector received the position of a director, and the Institute was largely autonomous.

On Oct. 1, 2014 at the VII St. Petersburg Innovations Forum the agreement was signed between ITMO University and United Elements Engineering and on Sept. 24, the Institute opened a department specializing in industrial climate equipment.

In 2015, the institute's departments of cryogenic technologies and refrigeration and of refrigeration equipment were transformed into ITMO University's Department of Cryogenic Techniques and Air Conditioning and Department of Food Biotechnologies and Engineering. The Institute in its previous form seized its existence.

== Chronology names ==
- 1772—1917 — Imperial Commercial College
- 1931—1934 — Leningrad Teaching Mechanics and Technology Refrigeration Plant
- 1934—1947 — Leningrad Mechanics and Technology Refrigeration Plant
- 1947—1953 — Leningrad Institute of Refrigeration and Dairy Processing
- 1953—1991 — Leningrad Technological Institute of Refrigeration
- 1991—1993 — St. Petersburg Red Banner Technological Institute of Refrigeration
- 1993—1994 — St. Petersburg Technological Institute of Refrigeration
- 1994—1999 — St. Petersburg State Academy of Refrigeration and Food Processing
- 1999—2011 — St. Petersburg State University of Low-Temperature and Food Processing Technologies
- 2011—2015 — Department Institute of Refrigeration and Biotechnologies of ITMO University
- 2015 till now — Department of Cryogenic Techniques and Air Conditioning and Department of Food Biotechnologies and Engineering of ITMO University
