= Suponevo, Bryansk Oblast =

Putyovka Супонево
- Selo
- Location within Bryansk Oblast Location within Russia
- Coordinates: 53°12′N 34°19′E
- Country: Russia
- Region: Bryansk Oblast
- District: Bryansky District
- Time zone: UTC+3:00

Suponevo (Russian: Супо́нево) is a rural locality (a selo) and the administrative center of Suponevskoye Rural Settlement, Bryansky District, Bryansk Oblast, Russia. Population: 9,450 (2021 census); 8,585 (2010). There are 96 streets.

== Geography ==
Suponevo is located 25 km southeast of Glinishchevo (the district's administrative centre) by road. Antonovka is the nearest rural locality.
