= Michurinsky, Paninsky District, Voronezh Oblast =

Michurinsky Мичуринский
- Settlement
- Location within Voronezh Oblast Location within Russia
- Coordinates: 51°35′N 40°12′E
- Country: Russia
- Region: Voronezh Oblast
- District: Paninsky District
- Time zone: UTC+3:00

Michurinsky (Russian: Мичуринский) is a rural locality (a settlement) in Mikhaylovskoye Rural Settlement, Paninsky District, Voronezh Oblast, Russia. The population was 258 as of 2010. There are 5 streets.

== Geography ==
Michurinsky is located 11 km southeast of Panino (the district's administrative centre) by road. Sergeyevka is the nearest rural locality.
