= Michurinsky, Ertilsky District, Voronezh Oblast =

Michurinsky Мичуринский
- Settlement
- Location within Voronezh Oblast Location within Russia
- Coordinates: 51°49′N 40°49′E
- Country: Russia
- Region: Voronezh Oblast
- District: Ertilsky District
- Time zone: UTC+3:00

Michurinsky (Russian: Мичуринский) is a rural locality (a settlement) in Ertil, Ertilsky District, Voronezh Oblast, Russia. The population was 291 as of 2010. There are 3 streets.

== Geography ==
Michurinsky is located 3 km south of Ertil (the district's administrative centre) by road. Krasnoarmeysky is the nearest rural locality.
