= Prokofi Akinfiyevich Demidov =

Russian businessman

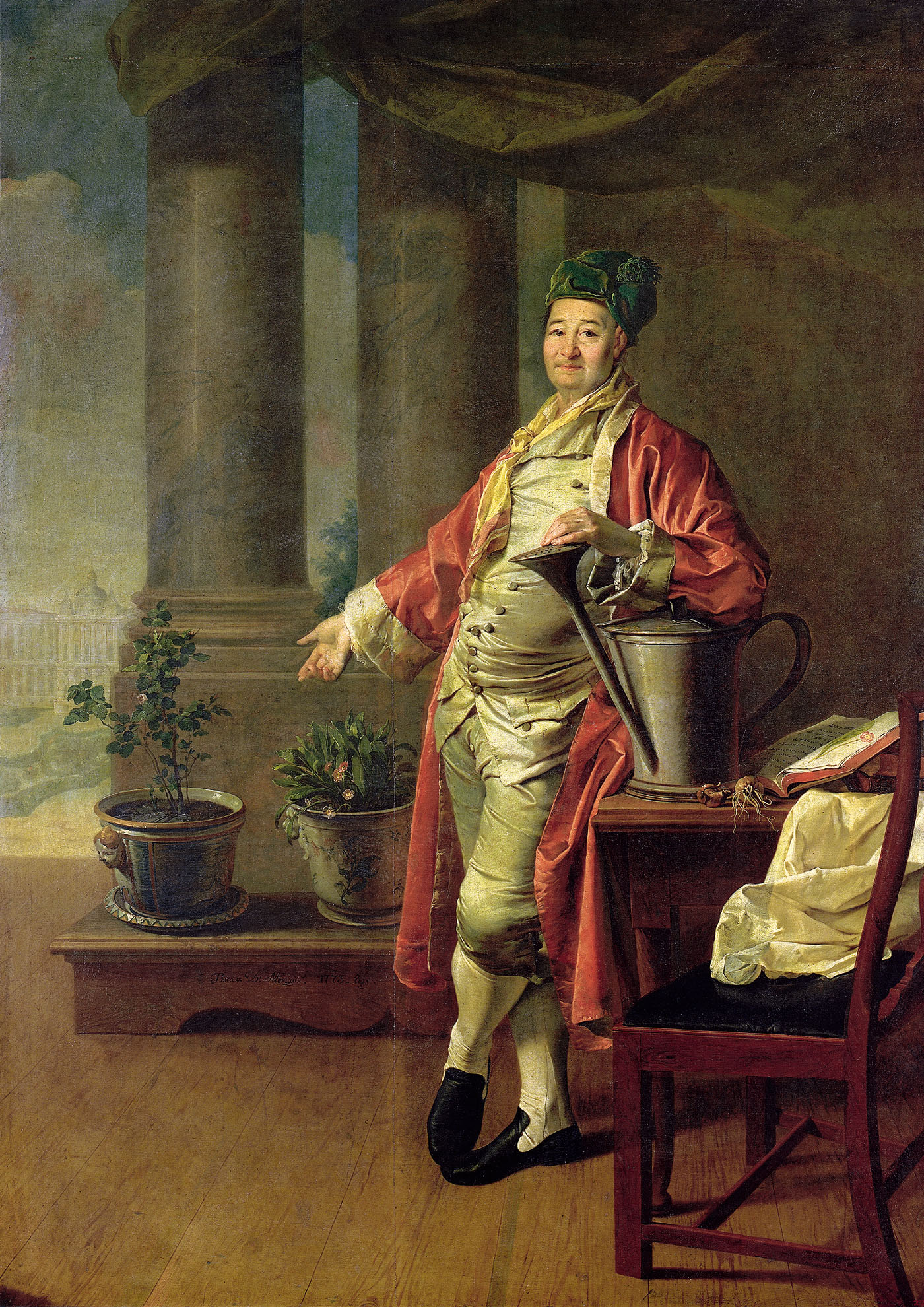
A portrait of Prokofi Demidov by Dmitri Levitsky (1773) is in the Tretyakov Gallery.

Prokofi Akinfiyevich Demidov (1710–1786) was a Russian industrialist and philanthropist; he was also Russia's first millionaire.

The eldest son of Akinfiy Demidov, Prokofi inherited the enormous Demidov family fortune on his father's death in 1745. He gave freely to charitable works, founding an orphanage and a scientific institute in Moscow and a school of commerce in Saint Petersburg, as well as financing the opera in Saint Petersburg and hundreds of people's schools and philanthropic institutions across Russia.

His eccentricities were famous and, because he thought he had been deceived by British merchants during a stay in England, one day he bought all the available hemp to "teach the English a lesson". Even so, he managed to increase the family fortune so that, on his death, he owned 55 foundries and metallurgical factories. His tomb is in the Donskoy Monastery.

Demidov was interested in botany, wrote a treatise on bees, collected a herbarium, and had a number of birds caged in his house. A catalogue of his plants was prepared by Peter Simon Pallas; according to the catalogue, the garden had 2,000 species in 1781. His best-known garden was at the Neskuchnyi estate on the banks of the Moscow River. His manuscript of Kirsha Danilov's folk songs is preserved in the Russian National Library.

He married firstly Matryona Antipovna Pastukhova (1711-1764) and secondly Tatyana Vasilievna Semyonova (1746-1800). He had nine children with the first wife and three children with the second wife. His children that lived to adults were:

- Lev Prokofievich Demidov (1738-1801); married Avdotya Vasilievna Molchanova, had issue (11 children).
- Akaki Prokofievich Demidov (1740-1811); married three times: Anna Demidova; Alexandra Ivanovna Alfimova (five children) and Anna Vasilievna.
- Anna Prokofievna Demidova (1751-1828); married Danila Danilovich Zemskoy, had issue (three children).
- Ammos Prokofievich Demidov (1753-1806); married Anna Nikiforovna Vyazemskaya, had issue (five children).
- Nastasya Prokofievna Demidova (1754-1777); married Sergei Kirillovich Stanislavsky (1721-1776). No issue.
- Natalya Prokofievna Demidova (1765-1783); married?
- Anastasia Prokofievna Demidova (1768-1802); married Mark Ivanovich Khozikov, had issue (four children).
- Matrjona Prokofievna Demidova (- c. 1784); married Grigory Ivanovich Shchepochkin, had issue (seven children).
