= Komarichsky District =

Komarichsky District Комаричский район (Russian)
- District
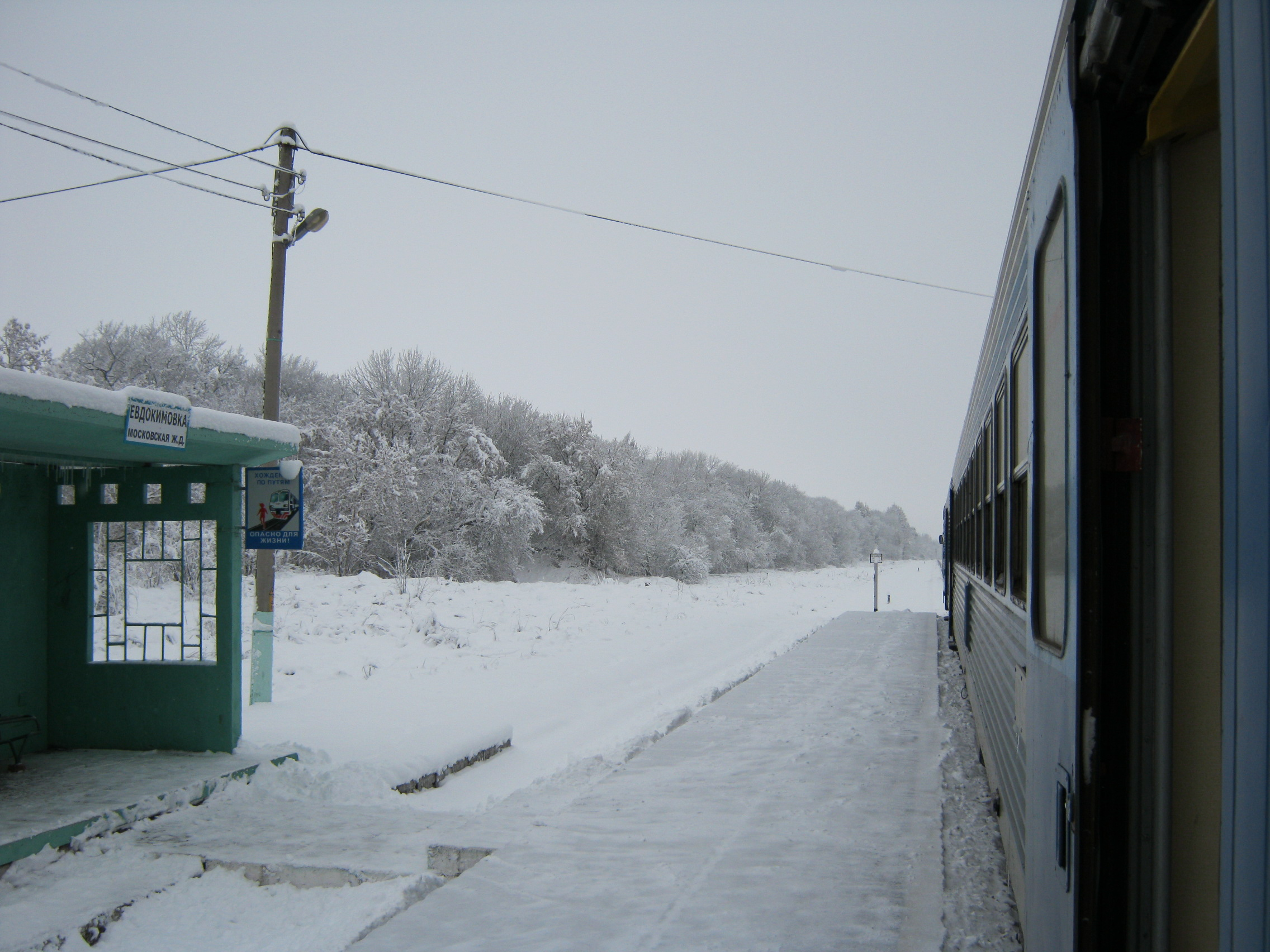

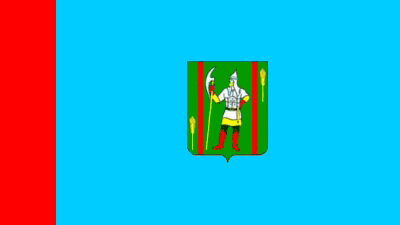
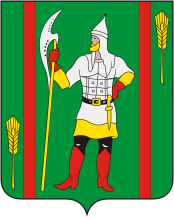
- Flag Coat of arms
- Location of Komarichsky District in Bryansk Oblast
- Coordinates: 52°25′N 34°48′E
- Country: Russia
- Federal subject: Bryansk Oblast
- Established: 1929
- Administrative center: Komarichi

Area
  - Total: 1,020 km^{2} (390 sq mi)

Population (2010 Census)
  - Total: 18,064
  - Density: 17.7/km^{2} (45.9/sq mi)
  - Urban: 42.5%
  - Rural: 57.5%

Administrative structure
  - Administrative divisions: 1 Settlement administrative okrugs, 7 Rural administrative okrugs
  - Inhabited localities: 1 urban-type settlements, 92 rural localities

Municipal structure
  - Municipally incorporated as: Komarichsky Municipal District
  - Municipal divisions: 1 urban settlements, 7 rural settlements
- Time zone: UTC+3 (MSK)
- OKTMO ID: 15632000
- Website: http://adminkom.ru/

Komarichsky District (Russian: Кома́ричский райо́н) is an administrative and municipal district (raion), one of the twenty-seven in Bryansk Oblast, Russia. It is located in the southeast of the oblast. The area of the district is 1,020 square kilometers (390 sq mi). Its administrative center is the urban locality (a work settlement) of Komarichi. Population: 15,859 (2021 census); 18,064 (2010 census); 20,065 (2002 Census); 21,649 (1989 Soviet census). The population of Komarichi accounts for 46.2% of the district's total population.
