= Vladimir Zhutenkov =

Russian businessman and politician (1962–2021)

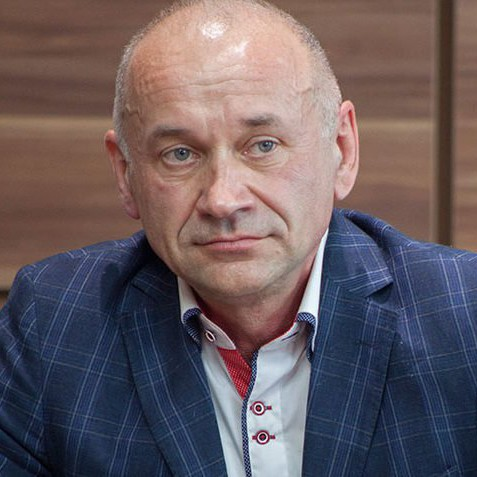
- Zhutenkov in 2016

Member of the State Duma
- In office 5 October 2016 – 12 June 2017

Member of the Bryansk Oblast Duma
- In office 12 March 2009 – 5 October 2016

Personal details
- Born: 2 April 1962 Bryansk, Russian SFSR, Soviet Union
- Died: 14 November 2021 (aged 59) Tura, Russia
- Party: United Russia

Vladimir Zhutenkov (Russian: Владимир Александрович Жутенков; 2 April 1962 – 14 November 2021) was a Russian businessman and politician. A member of United Russia, he served in the State Duma from 2016 to 2017.

== Biography ==
In 1981, he received a secondary technical education as a mechanical technician after graduating from the Bryansk Polytechnic College.

In 1980, he began working at the Bryansk Machine-Building Plant as a turner. From 1981 to 1987, he worked in Krasnoyarsk Krai with the Yenisei Geophysics Association, serving as a sixth-grade fitter in the Boguchany geophysical expedition and later as a geophysics technician. From 1987 to 1992, he worked in the Evenkiya geophysical expedition as an all-terrain vehicle driver (fourth grade), senior engineer for the repair of geological exploration equipment, transport mechanic, and head of the expedition’s transport division.

In 1992, he returned to Bryansk and in 1992–1993 worked as deputy director at the company Miran. In 1993, in the town of Seltso, Bryansk Oblast, he established a private enterprise, Tamosh, based on a leased sausage workshop of the regional consumer union. In 1997, the enterprise was renamed Tamosh Meat Processing Plant LLC, where he worked as director, and since 1999 as general director. In 2006, he founded the agricultural enterprise Druzhba LLC and headed it. From 2008 to 2016, he served as business manager of both Tamosh Meat Processing Plant LLC and Druzhba LLC.

In March 2009, he ran as a candidate for the Bryansk Regional Duma on the United Russia party list and was elected as a deputy. In September 2014, he was again elected deputy of the Bryansk Regional Duma from single-member constituency No. 18, representing United Russia. In the Regional Duma, he served on the Committee on Agrarian Policy and Natural Resource Management, as well as the Committee on Budget, Taxes, and Economic Policy.

In 2015, he created the Okhotno holding, which united five enterprises in the agro-industrial sector: Druzhba LLC, engaged in pork production and processing, crop farming, and feed production; Druzhba-2 LLC, engaged in vegetable production; Niva LLC and Kommunar LLC, engaged in dairy cattle breeding and milk production; and Tamosh Meat Processing Plant LLC, engaged in meat processing and production. Two of the five enterprises were headed by his sons. In 2016, he himself held the position of head of investment projects of the Okhotno holding.

In 2016, he ran for the State Duma from United Russia in single-member constituency No. 77 and was elected deputy of the 7th State Duma. He then resigned his mandate as a regional deputy. After his election, journalists reported that he owned a Patek Philippe watch worth seven million rubles, as noted by the media outlet Life and the Bryansk newspaper Komsomolets Bryanska.

In June 2017, Zhutenkov submitted his resignation from the State Duma. Vice Speaker Sergei Neverov announced his resignation and stated that he had offered Zhutenkov the position of his advisor on agricultural issues.

He died on 14 November 2021 in Kamchatka during a vacation when his snowmobile crashed into a tree. Several months earlier, his son Dmitry Zhutenkov had died in a motorcycle accident.

== Criminal case and conviction related to a traffic accident ==
On 6 September 2013, while driving his Volkswagen Touareg, Zhutenkov failed to yield the right of way when pulling out from the roadside, colliding with a Lada Priora (VAZ-217230) moving in the same direction. A 33-year-old passenger of the Priora, who was eight months pregnant, suffered pelvic fractures and lost her child as a result. A criminal case was opened only six months later, in March 2014, and in May 2014 it was transferred to court. In June 2014, the case was dismissed due to reconciliation of the parties. The dismissal on non-exonerating grounds did not relieve Zhutenkov of a criminal record, which did not prevent his subsequent election to the Regional Duma in September 2014 and to the State Duma in September 2016 as a United Russia candidate.

== Awards ==
- Badge of Honour of the Governor of Bryansk Oblast “For Mercy” (1st, 2nd, and 3rd class).
- Certificate of Gratitude from the Governor of Bryansk Oblast.
- Governor’s Prize “Golden Ear”.
