= Bryansky District =

Bryansky District Брянский район (Russian)
- District
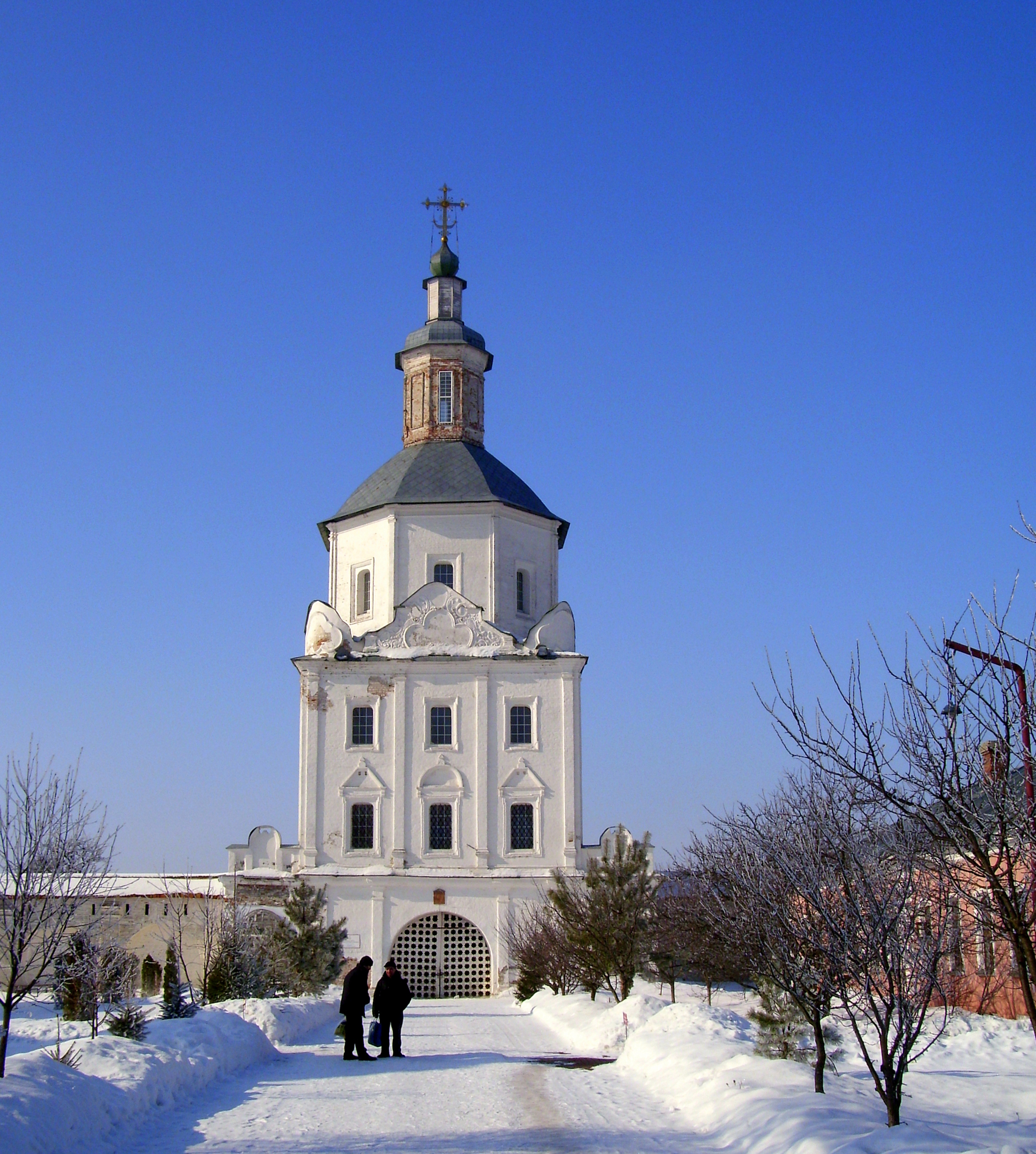
- Svensky Monastery

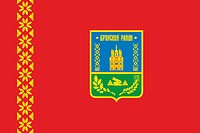
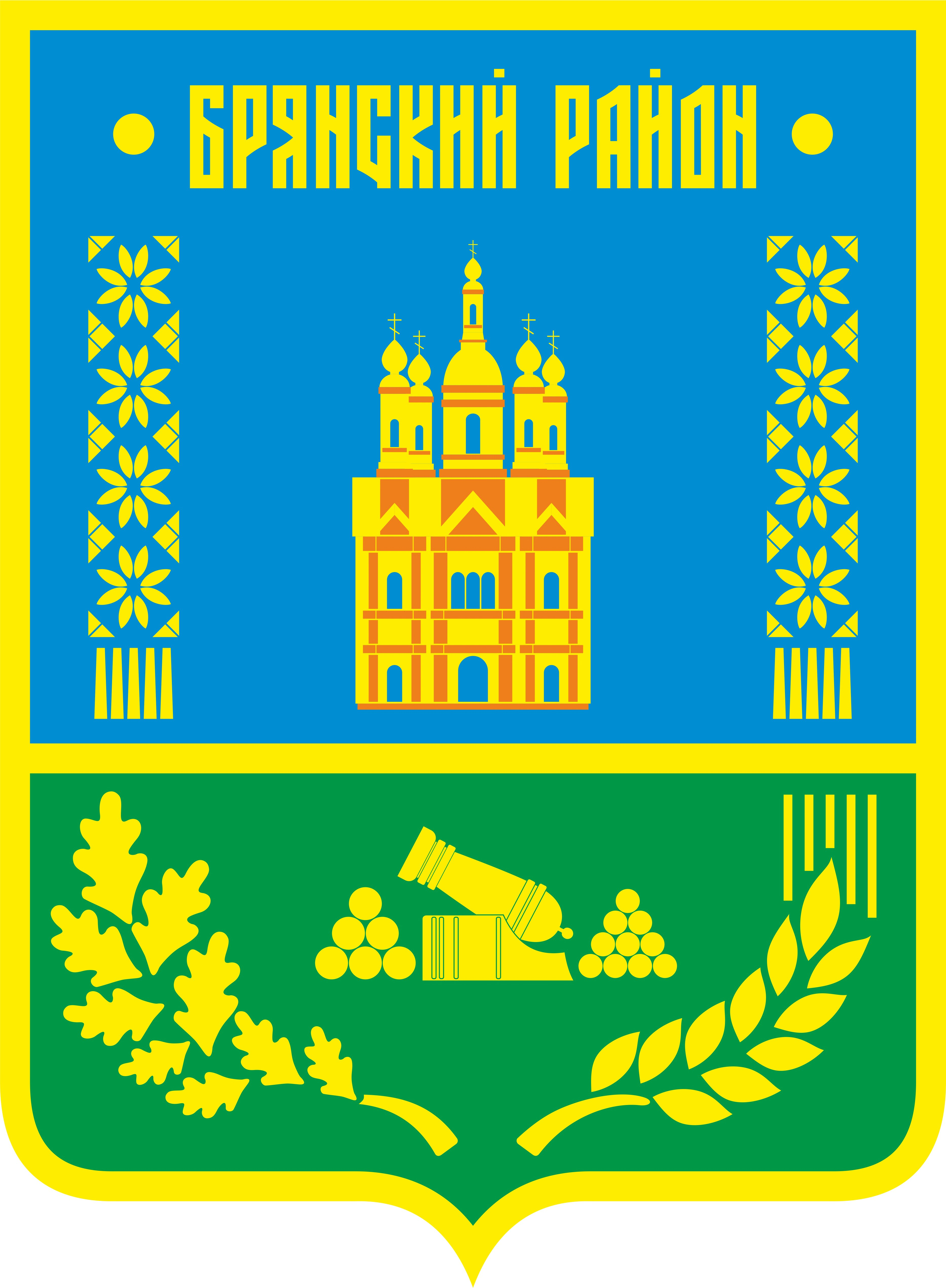
- Flag Coat of arms
- Location of Bryansky District in Bryansk Oblast
- Coordinates: 53°16′N 34°25′E
- Country: Russia
- Federal subject: Bryansk Oblast
- Established: 1929
- Administrative center: Glinishchevo

Area
  - Total: 1,801 km^{2} (695 sq mi)

Population (2010 Census)
  - Total: 56,496
  - Density: 31.37/km^{2} (81.25/sq mi)
  - Urban: 0%
  - Rural: 100%

Administrative structure
  - Administrative divisions: 15 Rural administrative okrugs
  - Inhabited localities: 98 rural localities

Municipal structure
  - Municipally incorporated as: Bryansky Municipal District
  - Municipal divisions: 0 urban settlements, 15 rural settlements
- Time zone: UTC+3 (MSK)
- OKTMO ID: 15608000
- Website: admbr.ru

Bryansky District (Russian: Бря́нский райо́н) is an administrative and municipal district (raion), one of the twenty-seven in Bryansk Oblast, Russia. It is located in the northeast of the oblast. The area of the district is 1,801 square kilometers (695 sq mi). Its administrative center is the rural locality (a selo) of Glinishchevo. Population: 71,266 (2021 census); 56,496 (2010 census); 52,959 (2002 Census); 72,530 (1989 Soviet census).

== Administrative and municipal status ==
Within the framework of administrative divisions, Bryansky District is one of the twenty-seven in the oblast. Until February 14, 2014, the city of Bryansk served as its administrative center, despite being incorporated separately as a city of oblast significance—an administrative unit with the status equal to that of the districts. Since February 14, 2014, the rural locality (a selo) of Glinishchevo has been the administrative center.

As a municipal division, the district is incorporated as Bryansky Municipal District. The city of oblast significance of Bryansk has always been incorporated separately from the district as Bryansk Urban Okrug.
