= Open Innovations =

Open Innovations Forum and Technology Show
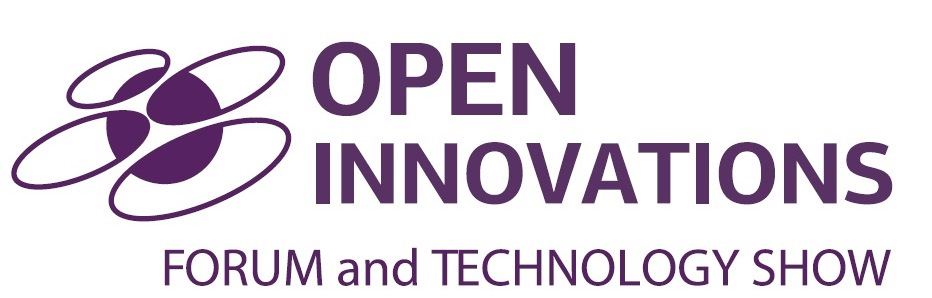
- Status: Active
- Genre: Innovations, science, economy
- Location: Moscow
- Country: Russia
- Inaugurated: 2012
- Organizer: Moscow City Government, Skolkovo Foundation; RVC; Vnesheconombank; RUSNANO; FASIE
- Website: forinnovations.com

Open Innovations (Forum and Technology Show) is an annual international forum that focuses on new technologies and perspectives of the international cooperation on innovations.

The focus of Forum is to provide a platform for discussions, interaction and exchange amongst experts in leading edge technologies, scientists, top-managers from Russian and foreign corporations, startups, and state authorities including top public officials. The international exhibition of high-tech achievements is also part of Forum.

Forum has been held in Moscow since 2012 under the guidance of the Russian Government with the support of Ministry of Economic Development of Russia, Moscow City Government and Russian development institutes: Rusnano, Russian Venture Company, Skolkovo Foundation, Vnesheconombank, Foundation for Assistance to Small Innovative Enterprises in Science and Technology (FASIE).

Forum aims to establish itself as a major global innovation platform, capable of predicting the development of the global innovative ecosystem, popularize innovative Research and Developments, involve top public officials, international corporations and leaders of the innovation community into a dialogue about strategic partnership, and create new tools of international cooperation in innovation.

== History ==
=== Forum 2012 ===
The first Open Innovations Forum and Open Innovations Expo (an associate exhibition) took place in Moscow between 31 October and 3 November 2012, in Expocentre. For three days Forum hosted more than 150 events involving 700 speakers from 40 countries.

Forum was attended by more than 5000 people from 42 regions of Russia and 30 countries around the world. The event was also broadcast online to a wider audience.

With 22 000 sqm of space, Open Innovations Expo hosted more than 500 companies from 16 countries representing more than 1000 of the latest engineering solutions. The exhibition was attended by 10 000 people.

The organizing committee of Open Innovations Forum was chaired by Vladislav Surkov. Dmitry Medvedev and other officials participated in the first day sessions of Forum.

Deputy prime ministers Vladislav Surkov and Arkady Dvorkovich gave speeches and represented Russian government agencies at Forum. Heads of Russian state corporations Igor Agamirzyan (RVC), Anatoly Chubais (Rusnano), Viktor Vekselberg (Skolkovo) also spoke at Forum.

Among the many participants were Sir Richard Branson, founder of Virgin Group, Josh Lerner, head of the Entrepreneurial Management unit at Harvard Business School, Alan AtKisson, counselor of the United Nations Commission on Sustainable Development, David Yang, founder and director of the board of ABBYY, Wim Elfrink, Cisco's executive vice president and CGO for Industry Solutions, John Gage, co-founder of Sun Microsystems, Hans Vestberg, president and CEO of Ericsson AB.

Forum resulted in more than 20 signed agreements between major Russian and global companies in the field of renewable energy, hi-tech technologies, education, science, healthcare and standardization.

According to research conducted by the Centre for Studying Regional Problems, Forum rated second in TOP-10 events in the area of innovations in 2012.

=== Forum 2013 ===
In 2013, Forum and exhibition took place in Moscow between 31 October and 2 November in Crocus Expo International Exhibition Center. Forum hosted 75 events including ambassadors and foreign delegations from 22 countries, Russian and foreign ministers, Russian innovators from 26 districts of the Russian Federation, and 28 governors of the constituent entities of Russia.

Forum was attended by more than 4000 people from 47 countries. The event was covered by 900 representatives of mass media. The organizing committee of Open Innovations Forum was chaired by Deputy Prime Minister Arkady Dvorkovich; and Sergei Sobyanin, the mayor of Moscow, officially opened the Forum.

The main topic of Forum in 2013 was "Disruption and Innovation: Game Changers Powering the Global Market". This topic was discussed during 3 plenary sessions and 60 industry sessions with 400 performing speakers.

For the first time in 2013, Forum introduced the term, "partner country". Finland and France became partner countries in 2013. Representing Russia and partner countries respectively were, Dmitry Medvedev, prime-minister of Russia, Jyrki Katainen, prime-minister of Finland, and Jean-Marc Ayrault, prime-minister of France. The three dignitaries took part in Forum where they met with representatives of innovative entrepreneurship and scientific community, members of "100 innovators" youth program, and participated in the plenary sessions.

Before the plenary sessions Dmitry Medvedev has a bilateral meeting with Jyrki Katainen.

Among other invited participants were Jason Pontin, editor-in-chief of MIT Technology Review; Andrea Wong, president of Sony Pictures Entertainment; Ralph Simon, CEO of Mobilium Global; Duncan Mitchell, senior vice president of Emerging Markets at Cisco, EVP Innovation and R&D; Gerald Schotman, chief technology officer at Royal Dutch Shell; Ian Hudson, president of DuPont Europe, Middle East and Africa and many others.

Representing government agencies were: Vladislav Surkov, deputy prime-minister; Igor Agamirzyan (CEO, RVC); Anatoly Chubais (chairman of board of directors, Rusnano) and Viktor Vekselberg (president of Skolkovo).

There were 530 companies from 9 countries gathered at the integrated Open Innovations Expo exhibition which demonstrated more than 1000 hi-tech developments and attracted more than 12 000 people.

The first two days of Forum resulted in the signing of more than 30 agreements on cooperation in aerospace, chemistry, areas in IT, education, ecosystem enhancement, competence and business development.

=== Forum 2014 ===
In 2014, between 14 and 16 October, Open Innovations Forum and exhibition took place in Technopolis Moscow and attracted more than 15 000 people from 70 countries.

Forum hosted more than 160 events and welcomed representatives of science, education, technological companies, investors and state authorities with more than 800 startups from 19 countries.

The official partner country of the 2014 Forum was the People's Republic of China.

Chinese partners held a special event within Forum called "Dialogue on Innovations: Interaction of Innovation Policies of the Partner Countries" where experts outlined trends for further cooperation with Russia.

Forum was personally attended by Li Keqiang, the premier of the state council of the People's Republic of China.

The ability to create, promote and implement innovations is a key factor in competitiveness. The Asia Pacific countries have attained impressive results in the past few years, including China, India, Japan, South Korea, Vietnam, Malaysia and Singapore, which is encouraging talk about the rise of a new global economic pole. Russia is both a European and an Asian country, and we are interested in strengthening our positions in the Pacific region.

— Dmitry Medvedev, Prime Minister of Russia, 2014

The main topic of Forum "Creative Destruction: Staying Competitive in the 21st Century" was discussed at more than 70 events.

The highlight of the plenary session, "Emerging Global Innovation Map and Ways to Close the Technological Gap between Countries", was the participation of Dmitry Medvedev and Li Keqiang, heads of the government of Russian and China.

The session also welcomed Andrei Fursenko, aide to the president of the Russian Federation; Dmitry Livanov, minister of education and science of the Russian Federation; Denis Manturov, minister of industry and trade; Sergei Donskoi, minister of natural resources and environment; Sergey Sobyanin, mayor of Moscow.

Among other participants of Open Innovations Forum 2014 were Cabinet members Nikolai Nikiforov and Alexander Galushka; heads of companies: Viktor Vekselberg (Skolkovo), Dmitry Konov (Sibur), Anatoly Chubais (Rusnano), Bo Andersson (AvtoVAZ), Guo Ping (Huawei), Joe Liu (3M), Rupert Keeley (PayPal); scientists: Vladimir Fortov, Kurt Wüthrich and others.

The key speakers at Forum were Richard Roberts (New England Biolabs), Kurt Wüthrich (EZH Zürich), Zhores Alferov, Bertrand Piccard (Solar Impulse), Georgette Yakman (STEAM Education), and Eckard Foltin (Bayer MaterialScience).

At the end of Forum winners of GenerationS 2014, the federal accelerating competition for technological startups, were announced. The winners were Promobot (Industrial), Kera-Tech (BioTechMed), NanoServ (CleanTech) and VeeRoute (IT).

=== Forum 2015 ===
In 2015, Forum and exhibition took place in Moscow on 28 October-1 November at Pavilion 75, VDNH. For five days Forum hosted 115 business events involving more than 200 speakers from more than 30 countries. In 2015, the participants of Forum discussed how technologies influence productivity, habitat, education, health and entertainment.

The major event of Forum in 2015 was the plenary session "Humanity in the Center of the Technological Revolution" that took place on 28 October. It involved Prime-Ministers of Russia and Serbia – Dmitry Medvedev and Aleksandar Vučić as well as economist Jeremy Rifkin, futurist Gerd Leonhard, ABBYY founder David Yang. The session was moderated by Mike Butcher (TechCrunch Europe).

Among the many participants were economist Nouriel Roubini, airspace designer Burt Rutan, Jim Morris (Pixar), Aubrey de Grey (SENS Research Foundation), Axel Flaig (Airbus), Carlo Ratti (SENSEable City Lab MIT).

Representing government agencies were Deputy Prime-Minister of Russia Arkady Dvorkovich, mayor of Moscow Sergey Sobyanin, Cabinet members of Russia, India, China, Brazil, Israel, the Republic of South Africa.

As part of Forum winners of competitions such as Venture Investor, RUSNANOPRIZE 2015, TechUp 2015, Tech in Media 2015 and other were announced.

The exhibition part of Forum featured Russian and foreign exhibits including the Moscow City Government, Russian development institutes, ministries of Russia, Association of Innovative Regions of Russia, IBM, Intel to name a few.

== Heads of states and governments who took part in Forum ==
The table below lists top public officials who participated in the events of Forum as well as events throughout.

Country	Post	Name	Photograph	Years of participation	Ref.
Russia	Prime Minister of the Russian Federation	Dmitry Medvedev		2012, 2013, 2014	
Finland	Prime Minister of Finland	Jyrki Katainen		2013	
France	Prime Minister of France	Jean-Marc Ayrault		2013	
China	Premier of the State Council of the People's Republic of China	Li Keqiang		2014	
Serbia	Prime Minister of Serbia	Aleksandar Vučić		2015	

== Associated events ==
Apart from plenary sessions, Forum's program includes the exhibition, youth program and cultural program.

== Exhibition of hi-tech achievements ==
Open Innovations Forum also hosts the exhibition of hi-tech achievements. Between 2012 and 2014 the original name for the exhibition was Open Innovations Expo. In 2015, the exhibition evolved into Open Innovations Technology Show.

== Youth program ==
The youth program consists of a number of events for startups arranged as part of Open Innovations Forum. Selection procedures to decide on participants of the youth program are held both in Russia and abroad.

During Forum, members of the youth program are offered tours to innovation sites of Moscow, meet with representatives of development institute and investors, participate in lectures and master classes, and get involved in business program of Forum.
