= GenerationS =

GenerationS – is a Russian federal accelerator for technology start-ups. It is held by RVC since 2013 with the support of Russian companies, development institutions, representatives of venture infrastructure, Russian and international corporations.

== History ==
For the first time GenerationS took place in 2013. There were 1,600 applications from different companies collected, 70 of them were selected for the participating in acceleration program. 7 companies found investors, and 3 become Skolkovo’s residents.

In 2013, there were no industrial subdivision, the participants represented different areas of activity, such as IT, energy saving technologies, telecommunications, biotechnology and medicine, and others. 4 projects became the winners of GenerationS-2013 and divided the main prize 5 million rubles of .They are: a system of development and management of mobile applications Appercode (2,5 million), a water, soil and hard surfaces treatment technology of oil, oil products and heavy ions BioMikroGeli metals and a technology of 3D printing of metal products with high strength characteristics 3DMetalPrint (1 million rubles each), holographic navigation system WayRay (500 thousand rubles).

In 2014, the number of applications for participating in accelerator has risen to 1858 (142 cities in 13 countries). The largest number of applications came from Moscow (461), Kazan (198) and Saint Petersburg (183). More than 10% of the applicants of the project were members of the various programs, supporting startups or residents of the largest business incubators and technology parks, including the Skolkovo, IIDF, and more than 20 regional incubators.

As new feature, in 2014 participating projects were subdivided into 4 areas: IT - 725 projects, industrial solutions (Industrial direction) - 508 projects, resource-efficient technologies (CleanTech direction) - 302, biotech and medicine (BioTechMed direction) - 323 projects. Pre-selected projects participated in educational programs of acceleration and coaching directions’ sessions. Among the projects, submitted applications to participate in these programs, were selected about 200, and the best of them were invited to participate in the investment session during «Open Innovations» forum in Moscow.

For working with the projects during the accelerator a large number of authoritative experts were attracted. For example, in work of acceleration of the Industrial direction took part about 40 lecturers, among them were Boris Lipkin (former vice president of IBM), Thomas Gad, Bill Watkins (former head of Seagate Technology), Alena Vladimirskaya (founder Pruffi), Tim Hennessy (President Imergy Power Systems) and many other experienced entrepreneurs and experts.

Four winners of GenerationS-2014, one in each track, were chosen on October 15 during Moscow International Forum "Open Innovation". The best were: a robot-promoter Promobot (Industrial track), technology of processing keratin-waste in the high-protein feed additive Kera-Tech (BiotechMed track), bionanotechnology cleaning heating systems for buildings, pipelines, boilers, water heaters and other heating equipment from scale and other deposits NanoServ (Cleantech track) and service optimization of transport logistics VeeRoute (IT track)). The prize fund of GenerationS-2014 was 5 million rubles, and the value of prizes from partners for the winners and finalists of GenerationS-2014 was 40 million rubles. All finalists’ projects received grants in the amount of 1 million rubles from the Fund for Assistance to Small Innovative Enterprises in the scientific and technical sphere.

In 2015 GenerationS was held in updated concept: the accelerator served as a solution for creating a platform for corporate and industry accelerators collaborating with corporations.

April 27, 2015, when GenerationS started, was published a list of accelerator corporate partners, they were RusHydro, MTS, Sberbank-Technology, NPO Saturn, GC Morton and other Russian and international companies.

Accelerator-2015 was held at seven directions (tracks):

- Power & Energy (modern power generation companies);
- Telecom Idea (telecommunications);
- Robotics (automatic and robotic systems);
- Aerospace (technology for the aerospace industry);
- SmartCity (technology for life, "smart city»);
- Oil & Gas (technologies and materials in the oil and gas sector);
- BiotechMed (biotechnology and medicine).

There were 2566 applications for participation in GenerationS-2015 from 140 cities of 14 countries. The accelerator was divided into several stages: till July, 1 projects applications collected, from July, 1 to September, 1 took place pre-acceleration program and the selection of projects to track accelerators. It was for the first time in Russia when on-line acceleration program were produced for such a number of projects. On September, 1 the tracks’ corporate accelerators started. The result of their work were 35 projects (5 representatives of each of the seven industrial tracks) selected to the final GenerationS-2015 . Seven super-finalists, one from each track, were chosen by Internet users. In few days of voting took part 45 thousand people. Super-final of GenerationS-2015 took place on 15 December at the Moscow School of Management "Skolkovo" in the framework of the III Corporate Venture Summit, seven super-finalists made presentations to the expert jury. The winners shared the prize fund in proportion to the number of votes of the members of the Supervisory Board GenerationS and Internet users.

The best projects in 2015 are:

- Gene therapy anticancer medicine AntionkoRAN-M. The medicine was developed under the guidance of Academician Yevgeny Sverdlov, on the basis of the three RAS institutes: molecular genetics, bio-organic chemistry and biology of the gene. AntionkoRAN M is a molecule of DNA, which contains the gene and gene-killer immune system stimulant. The team received the Grand Prix in the amount of 8,253 million rubles.
- Samocat Sharing System. Sharing system scooters, which involves a number of original technical solutions. The prize was 1,211 million rubles.
- Turbodiagnostika. Hardware-software complex for control of turbine blades. The prize was 536,000 rubles.

== Organisers, partners and government support ==
The organizer of GenerationS is RVC. Accelerator is a strategic partner of the Foundation for Assistance to Small Innovative Enterprises in the scientific and technical sphere. GenerationS is also supported by the Ministry of Agriculture, Ministry of Mass Communications and the Ministry of Economic Development. More than 10 companies joined as corporate partners, some large companies establish their own nominations and prizes. The Supervisory board of GenerationS includes CEO of RVC Igor Agamirzyan, director of "Young Professionals" ASI Dmitry Peskov, the rector of the "Skolkovo" Andrei Sharonov, head of the Robotics center of "Skolkovo" foundation Albert Efimov and others.

== Awards ==
GenerationS was named the event of the year at annual national venture industry nomination Venture Awards Russia-2014, organized by media projects Firrma and RusBase.

== Criticism ==
Some experts are skeptical about the prospects of projects-winners of GenerationS. Thus, an expert on mobile communication and content services Sergey Polovnikov thinks that some of the most promising technology start-ups involved in GenerationS 2015, did not win the main prize, but was withdrawn from the competition by the corporate partners for the purpose to not disclose the information about know-hows.
