= RVC =

RVC may refer to:

in education:

- Rock Valley College, a community college in Rockford, Illinois
- Royal Victoria College, a women's residential college of McGill University, Montreal
- Royal Veterinary College, veterinary school in London

in other uses:

- Russian Venture Company
- Russian Volunteer Corps
- Rockville Centre, New York
- Reconfigurable video coding
- Reticulated vitreous carbon
- Retrieval-based Voice Conversion
- RVC, a Japanese record label founded as a joint venture between RCA Records and Victor Company of Japan
