= Alexander Borodich =

Russian venture investor, serial entrepreneur and digital media strategist

- Born: 28 July 1975 (age 51)
- Occupations: Investor, serial entrepreneur, digital media strategist

Alexander Borodich (Russian: Алекса́ндр Борóдич; born July 28, 1975) is a Russian venture investor, serial entrepreneur, and digital media strategist. Borodich is the former marketing director at Mail.ru Group. Borodich is a private investor, the founder of the Universa blockchain platform, the managing partner of the marketing communication agency FutureAction, the founder of FutureLabs, and the founder of VentureClub, a Russian investment and business angel network. He is the former principal of the Economic and Mathematical School at Moscow State University (2010–2013), and Chairman of the Scientific Research & Innovative Technologies Commission at the International Aerospace Committee as of 2024.

== Early life and education ==
Borodich was born in Moscow, Russia, on July 28, 1975.

In 1999, Borodich graduated from the Moscow State Institute of Electronics and Mathematics, and in 2003 he completed his graduate studies.

He holds a master's degree from the National Research University Higher School of Economics, Department of Marketing.

In 2008, Borodich received an MBA from the Stockholm School of Economics.

== Career ==
Alexander Borodich started his career as a project manager and web architect at Intel in 1999. In 2000, he joined ThinkWave as a web developer. In 2002, he held the position of Head of e-commerce at the research and consulting company DirectInfo.

From 2003 to 2005, Borodich was involved in online marketing at MAR Consult, while working on his own project called ViralMeter, a viral marketing tracking service. From 2005 to 2009, he was a Marketing Director at Acronis, USA, where he managed online marketing communication worldwide.

In 2009–2010, Borodich directed online marketing initiatives at Mail.ru Group as a Marketing Director. He negotiated new key partnerships and led media campaigns for Mail.ru. In 2010, Borodich became Director General at Rumart.ru, and later, co-founder and CEO at Glomper.

In 2012, Borodich co-founded MyWishBoard.com, a service for creating wish lists that can be shared with friends through social networks.

Since 2013, he has been a managing partner and lecturer at FutureLabs and FutureAction. Borodich began lecturing at Moscow State University in 2003 and also teaches at the National Research University Higher School of Economics.

== Entrepreneurship ==
Borodich has founded and managed several technology and investment-related projects:

- FutureLabs (Future Laboratory) — a company supporting innovation and startup development.
- VentureClub — a Russian investment and business angel network.
- Universa Blockchain — a blockchain platform founded in 2017, developed for enterprise and government digitalization projects.

Borodich also participated in the reorganization of EcoBrightFuture Inc. into Universal Token (NASDAQ: EBFI), a U.S.-based holding specializing in blockchain financial infrastructure. The company's projects include initiatives in tokenized commodities and digital asset management, particularly in the United Arab Emirates and Sri Lanka.

== Professional recognition ==
In 2012, Borodich was granted a patent in the USA on assessing the effectiveness of information dissemination in social networks.

The same year, he was one of the winners at the MobileBeat Innovation Competition (San Francisco).

In 2014, the Russian National Business Angels Association recognized Borodich as Russia's "business angel of the year" at a ceremony at the Skolkovo Hypercube. In 2015, the Russian Venture Capital (RVC), a government fund of funds and development institute, named Borodich Russia's most active business angel of the year.
