= MyGenetics =

Russian Biotechnology Company

- Industry: Biotechnology
- Founded: 2013; 13 years ago in Novosibirsk, Russia
- Founder: Alexander Cvetkovich, Vladimir Volobuev
- Headquarters: Novosibirsk, Russia
- Products: Genetic tests
- Parent: LLC National Center for Genetic Research
- Website: mygenetics.pro

MyGenetics is a Russian biotechnology company engaged in the development and conduct of DNA tests in the fields of nutrition, sports, cosmetics and health.

== History ==
The company was established in 2013 and after passing the expert selection became a resident of the business incubator of the Novosibirsk Technopark. The Internet Initiatives Development Fund has invested around 1.4 million rubles in the project.

MyGenetics is engaged in the development of DNA tests, interpretation of the results and making recommendations in the direction of nutrition, sports, cosmetology and health. The development of the tests technology in the field of personal genetics was carried out together with the Institute of Chemical Biology and Fundamental Medicine of the SB RAS.

Since 2016, MyGenetics has been a resident of the Novosibirsk Technopark. In the same year, MyBaby and MyBeauty DNA tests were presented at the international exhibition Thessaloniki International Fair.

In 2017, the company opened a second office in Peru.

In 2018, the company launched its own clinical diagnostic laboratory, in which it conducts all its research.

MyGenetics is a scientific partner of the Russian Union of Dietologists, Nutritionists and Food Industry Specialists, as well as the Union of Pediatricians of Russia.

The company took part in several international exhibitions: the Ibero-American Congress on Nutrition (Peru, 2017), the International Exhibition of Perfumery and Cosmetics Intercharm (Moscow), the international exhibition "Healthy Lifestyle" in the framework of the international forum "Russian Health Care Week" (Moscow, 2017) and others.

== Awards ==
- Gold Medal of the All-Russian Exhibition Center for the best innovative project (2014).
- The winner of the contest “100 best enterprises and organizations of Russia in the field of healthy lifestyle and active longevity” in the nomination of “The Best Project for Innovation” (2017).
- The Golden Mercury Award in the nomination of “The Best Small Enterprise in the Field of Innovation Activities” (2017).
