= RRT =

RRT or Rrt may refer to:

- Radio Reconnaissance Platoon
- Railroad Tycoon (series)
- Rainbow Round Table
- Rapidly exploring random tree
- Reference Rendering Transform (Academy Color Encoding System)
- Registered Respiratory Therapist
- Renal replacement therapy
- Randomized response technique
- Rational root theorem in mathematics
- Refugee Review Tribunal in Australia.
- Recommended Replacement Time (In Pacemaker and Internal Defibrillator, time to replace the device because of exhaustion of the batteries)
- Warroad International Memorial Airport (IATA code), airport in Warroad, Minnesota
- RRT Global, company specialising in technologies for oil refining
- Rapid Relief Team (RRT), global charity supporting emergency services and communities in need
