= Internet Initiatives Development Fund =

Russian venture capital fund

- Purpose: Venture capital
- Location: Moscow, Russia
- Region served: Russia
- Method: Funding, Grants, Program Support, Advocacy
- Key people: Kirill Varlamov, CEO
- Website: www.iidf.ru

The Internet Initiatives Development Fund (IIDF, stylized in lowercase in its logo, Russian: Фонд развития интернет-инициатив) is a Russian venture capital fund established by the Agency for Strategic Initiatives. The Foundation invests in technology companies in the early stages of development, develops a network of start-up accelerators, and is involved in the development of methods of legal regulation of the venture industry.

Since 2013, IIDF has been the most active investment fund in Russia. According to the Dow Jones report, IIDF was ranked first in Europe by the number of transactions in the first quarter of 2014. By April 4, 2015, the fund has financed 150 projects, including 104 deals in 2014. IIDF is planning to invest 6 billion roubles in 400 companies by 2017.

Kirill Varlamov is the director of the Foundation.

== History ==
The idea of creating a fund to support socially significant initiatives was first voiced at a meeting of the Supervisory Board of the Agency for Strategic Initiatives on November 22, 2012. It was a suggestion implied creation of a tool of public-private partnership for the development of Internet projects specifically in Russia, a new priority of the Agency's work. At the next meeting of the Supervisory Board on March 5, 2013, the Agency introduced an online support fund project for entrepreneurial initiatives, and its future director. The objective of the fund was to create an infrastructure for expert and financial start-up support in the early stages of development, i.e., in the course of prototype development and market entry.

The volume of the fund, entitled The Foundation for Internet Development-Initiatives, amounted at 6 billion roubles and was formed using the funds of major Russian companies.

== Acceleration Programme ==
One of the key areas of IIDF's activities is represented by three-month business acceleration programmes. Under the guidance of a curator, teams undergo a 120-hour training course that consist of eight parts and includes sessions on marketing, sales organisation, development as well as consulting on company development. Team work is monitored by invited experts and representatives of other funds.

There are two types of acceleration: on-site and distance acceleration. For 7% in the company's share capital, IIDF provides participants of the full-time acceleration programme with workspace in the coworking and pre-seed investments in the amount of 1.4 million roubles, including the cost of the acceleration programme in the amount of 600,000 roubles. Participants of the distance acceleration programme work with curators and consultants remotely, and the Foundation does not receive the company's shares. Start-ups to succeed in acceleration programme present their projects to private investors and representatives of venture capital funds and are likely to get seed investments amounting at up to 14.5 million roubles.

In order to prepare teams for participation in acceleration programmes, IIDF established the so-called pre-accelerator, focusing on the development of start-up business models and improving their investment attractiveness.

=== Moscow ===
The first acceleration programme was made available for submission of applications on July 15, 2013. In a month, the Foundation received 993 applications, 199 of which were rejected as non-core. The Foundation interviewed all the teams, selecting 50 participants of the on-site and 50 participants of the distance acceleration programme. Immediately after the start of the first acceleration programme, a new programme was opened for submission of applications. 34 start-ups participated in the second acceleration programme launched at the end of February 2014. The third accelerator was launched in June 2014, bringing together 24 projects. The fourth acceleration programme launched at the end of September 2014 included 38 projects. Also, in the autumn of 2014, the Foundation expanded the area of investment, focusing on technological trends, and began to attract start-ups from the field of the Big data, gadgets, and the Internet of Things. The fifth on-site acceleration programme that took place from February to April 2015 included 28 projects. The sixth on-site acceleration programme lasted from February 6 to March 6, 2015. In 2015, priority investment areas included telecommunications, software for big businesses, large volume data processing technologies, machine learning, digital content distribution, information security, and intellectual property protection. A total of 174 projects completed IIDF's acceleration programmes.

=== Other Cities of Russia ===
The Foundation establishes regional acceleration programmes in cities with large technical universities and offices of technology companies. In March 2014, five regional acceleration programmes were established on the basis of existing educational infrastructure – incubators of the Saint Petersburg Ingria Technopark, the IT-parks in Krasnodar and Kazan, the Akademgorodok Technopark, and Ekaterinburg Centre for Enterprise Development. In the summer of 2015, IIDF established a distance acceleration programme in Sevastopol. Also that year, on September 1, on the basis of Ingria, the first regional on-site acceleration programme was established.

Saint Petersburg State University of Information Technologies, Mechanics and Optics is a partner in the development of IIDF's accelerator network that in the past launched its own start-up accelerator, iDealMachine.

=== Joint Accelerators ===
In September 2014, a joint acceleration programme of IIDF and Microsoft was launched for start-ups in the fields of education, health care, trade, production, services, financial sector, and municipal services. The acceleration programme includes two rounds of grant financing, technological support and access to the cloud infrastructure provided by Microsoft, expertise, and assistance in securing the next round of investments provided by IIDF as well as working space for the period of acceleration. Also, the Foundation for Internet Development-Initiatives participated in the preparation of the programme for projects in the field of IT as part of GenerationS acceleration programme launched by RVC and Moscow Innovation Development Centre in July 2014.

Since November 2014, Rambler&Co has been working on two acceleration programmes: one is being created in conjunction with IIDF, the other one, in cooperation with RVC. The acceleration programme in conjunction with the Foundation for Internet Development-Initiatives will be operating under the brand name Rambler to support projects from the fields related to the activities of the corporation – advertising, entertainment, Internet items, and e-commerce.

=== Other Educational Projects ===
IIDF is cooperating with investment funds and business incubators in the regions, provides consulting services, and implements educational programs. In Vladivostok, Yakutsk, Perm, and Sevastopol, the Foundation has established a multi-day start-up school. In Tomsk, IIDF annually organises trainings as part of the Gorod IT conference. The Foundation supports the start-up nomination at the HackDay hackathon. Monthly, the Foundation holds public meetings and lectures on its own site. The Foundation provides places in pre-acceleration programmes for all finalists of the Russian Developers Cup – a competition for programmers organised by Mail.Ru Group.

In addition, IIDF cooperates with the IT-acceleration programme of Ural Federal University, Kirov START UP 43 acceleration programme, and Dagestan Plug and Play.

== Investments ==
The peculiarity of the Russian market of venture investments lies in a small number of business angels, i.e., private investors working with start-ups in the very early stages of development. Angels not only finance companies in the stage of developing business ideas and prototypes, but also act as experts and advisors. IIDF serves precisely in the above-mentioned role, creating conditions for the development of new Internet companies. Simultaneously, the Foundation teaches new investors to invest in Internet start-ups. The Foundation operates a business angels club that grants private investors preferences when working with teams participating in acceleration programmes.

The majority of IIDF investments is represented by seed and pre-seed financing, but the Foundation's portfolio also includes a few substantial transactions.

=== Presentations of Start-Ups ===
The Foundation for Internet Development-Initiatives has presented acceleration programme projects to Vladimir Putin three times – in November 2013, June 2014, and March 2015. The teams of the first acceleration programme became the participants of the first presentation in Novo-Ogaryovo. During the meeting, the President gave a number of recommendations to start-ups and directed them to the relevant departments. ReAction, a facial recognition system, was recommended to the Federal Migration Service; All Tow Trucks of Russia, to the Ministry of Emergency Situations; Dr. Tariff, an application for the account of expenses for mobile communications, to the Ministry of Communications; Elpas, a system of electronic reporting of housing and communal services, to the newly established Ministry of Construction, Housing and Utilities. Norma Sugar, an application for diabetics, also received the President's approval, and the first deputy head of the Kremlin Chief of Staff, Vyacheslav Volodin, was instructed to submit the site builder of MoyaOkruga.rf municipal unities to the heads of the subjects.

The second presentation was held as part of the forum entitled Internet Business in Russia, organised by the Foundation for Internet Development-Initiatives. IIDF's start-ups were presented not only to Vladimir Putin, but also to such major event guests as Arkady Volozh of Yandex, Dmitry Grishin, Head of Mail.Ru Group, German Klimenko, founder of LiveInternet, and Maelle Gavet, Head of Ozon.ru. Making a speech, the President used a tool for planting trees called Passion Fruit. Vladimir Putin promised to support Key to Life, a system of rapid communication with physicians, and gave instructions on the subject of integrating IIDF's projects into existing state mechanisms. These instructions referred to Angry Citizen, a system of processing applications submitted by citizens; Unim Histology, a system of remote diagnosis of cancer; Easy Ten, an application for studying English; and Micronet, an accounting and data systematisation system for consumption of public resources.

At the third meeting on the premises of the presidential residence in Novo-Ogaryovo, start-ups asked for support in the development of the related areas. Oppty, a project related to copyright protection, proposed to include fighting piracy in the article of state expenses. The Director General of Unim Histology requested to include the term ‘remote diagnostics’ in legislation as it would allow to include start-up services in the list of start-up services provided under the mandatory health insurance. Putin directed Poiskstroek, a start-up that connects material suppliers with construction companies, to the head of Surgutneftegaz, Vladimir Bogdanov; Forecast NOW, a tool for accounting inventory, to the Minister of Economic Development, Alexey Ulyukaev; as well as promised to direct Turbazar, a tourist start-up, to the Federal Tourism Agency, and NDFLka.ru, a tool for filling out tax declarations, to the Federal Tax Service. All Tow Trucks of Russia, the project that repeatedly participated in the meetings with the President, received a recommendation to visit the forum of Shanghai Cooperation Organisation.

== Interaction with the State ==
=== Legislative Initiatives ===
In June 2015, amendments to the Civil Code proposed by IIDF and Private Law Research Centre under the President, approved by the President on 11 March 2015, are to come into effect. According to them, the following notions will be introduced to Russian legislation: certification of circumstances, (Note: Certification of circumstances involves compensation for the investor's losses by the founder should the former be deliberately misled about the circumstances of the agreement.) option of awarding contracts, (Note: Option of awarding contracts – an agreement imposing a certain obligation on the company's founder, i.e., to buy out the investor's share should performance targets be not achieved within a specified period of time.) property losses upon the occurrence of certain circumstances not related to breach of contract, (Note: Agreement on compensation for material losses upon the occurrence of certain circumstances not related to actual breach of contract provides for compensation by the company's founder for losses incurred on investors as a result of deterioration in asset quality due to circumstances that do not violate the terms of the contract (for example, due to the claims of tax authorities).) and a number of others. These changes are identical to the standards that exist in countries the jurisdiction of which is given preference by new technological companies, as opposed to Russian jurisdiction. The above-mentioned amendments will create conditions for registration of companies and conclusion of investment agreements in the Russian legal field.

Along with industry associations and business representatives, IIDF was involved in the preparation of the amendments to the Law on Storage of Personal Data directed to the President through the Internet Ombudsman. The changes proposed by the authors of the letter were intended to clarify the concept of personal data and the scope of the Law. The Foundation participated in the preparation of the criteria by which software can be recognised as Russian and its use, approved by the public authorities in accordance with the draft government decree that obliges state agencies to use only Russian software.

=== Institute for the Development of the Internet ===
Together with the Russian Association for Electronic Communications, ROCIT, Media and Communication Union, and the founder of LiveInternet, German Klimenko, the Foundation for Internet Development-Initiatives co-founded the Institute for Development of the Internet. This organisation is intended as a discussion platform for representatives of government and Internet companies, under which the parties will reach consensus on difficult issues. It is expected that the Institute will be able to act as an expert in making government decisions affecting the field of information technologies and to protect the interests of users and businesses.

== Assessment of the Foundation's Activities ==
=== Ratings ===
By December 2013, IIDF topped the list of active funds operating for less than one year in the study of the venture industry conducted by Firrma.ru with the support of the Russian Venture Company and PwC. In the ranking of the largest venture capital market participants drawn up by Public Opinion Fund based on an interview dated January 2014, IIDF and RVK came third after such foundations as Runa Capital and Almaz Capital Partners. Business Environment magazine (Russian: Деловая среда) claimed the creation of IIDF one of the 10 main events in 2013.

In December 2014, the Foundation won in the category Seed Investor of the Year at Venture Awards Russia 2014. By that time, the Foundation has invested approximately $13 million in 122 projects.

=== Awards ===
In 2014, the Foundation for Internet Development-Initiatives won the Runet Prize in the category Technology and Innovation.

== Criticism ==
Many market participants reacted positively to the establishment of the Foundation for Internet Development-Initiatives. The founder of Almaz Capital Partners, Alexander Galitsky, and managing partner of Bright Capital, Boris Ryabov, approved the newly established alternative to the existing institutions for the development of technology companies – Rusnano, Skolkovo, and Russian Venture Company. Comparing the state structures of business development, one of the authors of the online publication Zuckerberg Calls described IIDF as the most useful institution that grasps the needs of the market. Expert-Ural, a magazine and analytical centre, mentioned that the establishment of IIDF acceleration programmes was a recent major step in the formation of infrastructure for the development of IT-companies.

Other representatives of the venture capital industry reacted with apprehension to the emergence of a state fund. The founder and managing partner of Runa Capital, Dmitry Chikhachev, questioned the ability of the state to effectively invest in private businesses. The managing partner of Prostor Capital, Alexey Soloviev, considered the creation of IIDF to be risky in terms of establishment of state-owned monopoly in the venture capital industry.

The chairman of the Investment Committee of Waarde Capital, Vladimir Gromovskiy, in columns of Expert Magazine, described the way in which IIDF was created as ‘unofficial’, criticised its focus on Internet technologies instead of other technology sectors in need of investment. He characterised the start-ups financed by IIDF as alternative, and the volume of the Foundation, as excess to be able to support projects dismissed by other venture capital funds.
