= Sibur =

Russian petrochemicals company

- Company type: Joint-stock company
- Industry: Petrochemical
- Founded: 1995
- Headquarters: Moscow, Russia
- Revenue: $7.25 billion (31 December 2020)
- Operating income: $2.14 billion (2017)
- Net income: $356 million (31 December 2020)
- Total assets: $21.6 billion (31 December 2020)
- Total equity: $8.76 billion (31 December 2020)
- Number of employees: 44358 (2021)
- Website: sibur.ru

SIBUR (PJSC SIBUR Holding) is a Russian petrochemicals company founded in 1995 and headquartered in Moscow.

SIBUR is the largest integrated petrochemicals company in Russia and one of the fastest-growing companies in the global petrochemicals industry. Company purchases hydrocarbons and processes them into plastics, rubbers and other high value added products.

According to the company's webpage, the Group sells its petrochemical products on the Russian and international markets in two business segments: Olefins & Polyolefins (polypropylene, polyethylene, BOPP films, etc.), Plastics & Intermediates (EPS, PET, etc.), and Elastomers.

SIBUR's petrochemicals business utilises mainly its own feedstock, which is produced by its Midstream segment using by-products purchased from oil and gas companies. The group owns and operates Russia's largest and most extensive integrated midstream asset base for processing and transportation of APG and NGLs, located primarily in Western Siberia, which is the largest oil and gas producing region in Russia and where the Group sources most of its feedstock.

SIBUR's production facilities are located in over 20 Russian regions and employ over 44,000 employees as the company indicates. The company's products are used in the chemical, fast-moving consumer goods, automotive, construction, energy and other industries in 80 countries worldwide. According to Forbes magazine's ranking of Russian companies by revenue for 2019, Sibur was the 13th-largest in Russia.

The company has international presence: an office in Vienna, four offices in China, and an office in Istanbul. SIBUR has an extensive portfolio of clients in key regions for the company – Russia, Europe and China.

As of today, SIBUR is a leading emerging markets petrochemical group and the largest petrochemical producer in the Russian market, according to IHS.

SIBUR's newest petrochemicals facility ZapSibNeftekhim ranks in Top-5 largest petrochemicals projects in the world and is Europe's largest petrochemicals plant by capacity.

The Group is currently working on a new project Amur Gas Chemical Complex, which is set to become the largest base polymer facility globally by capacity.

== Operating segments ==
According to the company, SIBUR has four operating segments: two petrochemicals sub-segments – olefins & polyolefins and plastics, elastomers & intermediates – and a midstream (LPG, naphtha, natural gas) segment. These business segments vary in their end-user markets, supply and demand trends, value drivers, and, consequently, their profitability, however, they are highly integrated with most of the feedstock for the petrochemicals business supplied by the company's own Midstream segment.

=== Midstream ===
SIBUR acquires by-products of oil and gas extraction (APG and raw NGL) and transports them to gas processing plants (GPP) and gas fractionation units (GFU). GPPs process APG to produce marketable natural gas, as well as raw NGLs feedstock, while GFUs fractionate NGLs to produce LPG and naphtha, which are the main feedstock for petrochemical production.

The LPG and naphtha produced by SIBUR is then either sold externally or secured as feedstock for the Group's petrochemical business.

SIBUR's feedstock processing infrastructure includes seven out of the nine existing GPPs in Western Siberia, five compressor stations and three gas fractionation units.

Midstream facilities:

- Yuzhno-Balykskiy GPP based in Ugra region)
- Belozerniy GPP based in Nizhnevartovsk
- Gubkinskiy GPP based in Gubkinskiy
- Vyngapurovskiy GPP based in Purovskiy region
- Nizhnevartovskiy GPP based in Nizhnevartovsk
- Yuzhno-Priobskiy GPP (50%) (joint venture with Gazprom Neft Group)
- Zapsibtransgaz based in Nizhnevartovsk

=== Olefins & polyolefins (O&P) ===
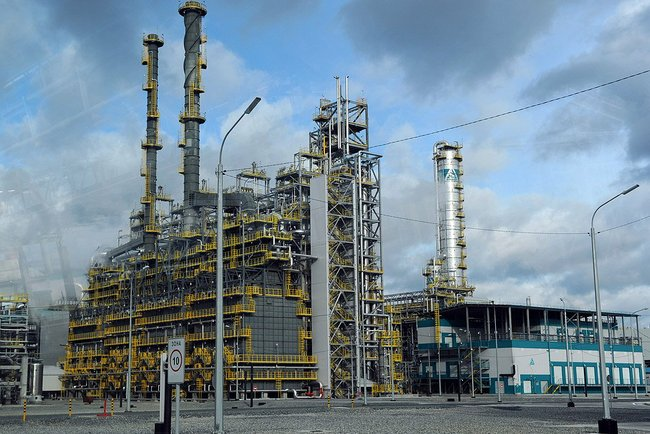
ZapSibNeftekhim

SIBUR uses NGL to create olefins, which are then turned into polyethylene and polypropylene via polymerisation. Polypropylene is also used to produce BOPP films, which is an important material for packaging.

O&P facilities:

- ZapSibNeftekhim (100%)
- Poliom (50%, JV with Gazprom Neft Group)
- BIAXPLEN (100%)
- Tomskneftekhim (100%)
- NPP Neftekhimia (50%) (joint venture with Gazprom Neft Group)
- Sibur-Kstovo (100%)
- RusVinyl (100%)
- Kazanorgsintez (64%) (though SIBUR RT).

=== Plastics, elastomers and intermediates ===
SIBUR's PE&I facilities produce the following products:

– plastics and organic synthesis products (PET, glycols, expandable polystyrene, DOTP, alcohols and acrylates)

– elastomers (rubbers)

– methyl tertiary butyl ether (MTBE) and fuel additives

– intermediates

These are used in the chemicals, FMCG, construction, automotive, agriculture and other industries.

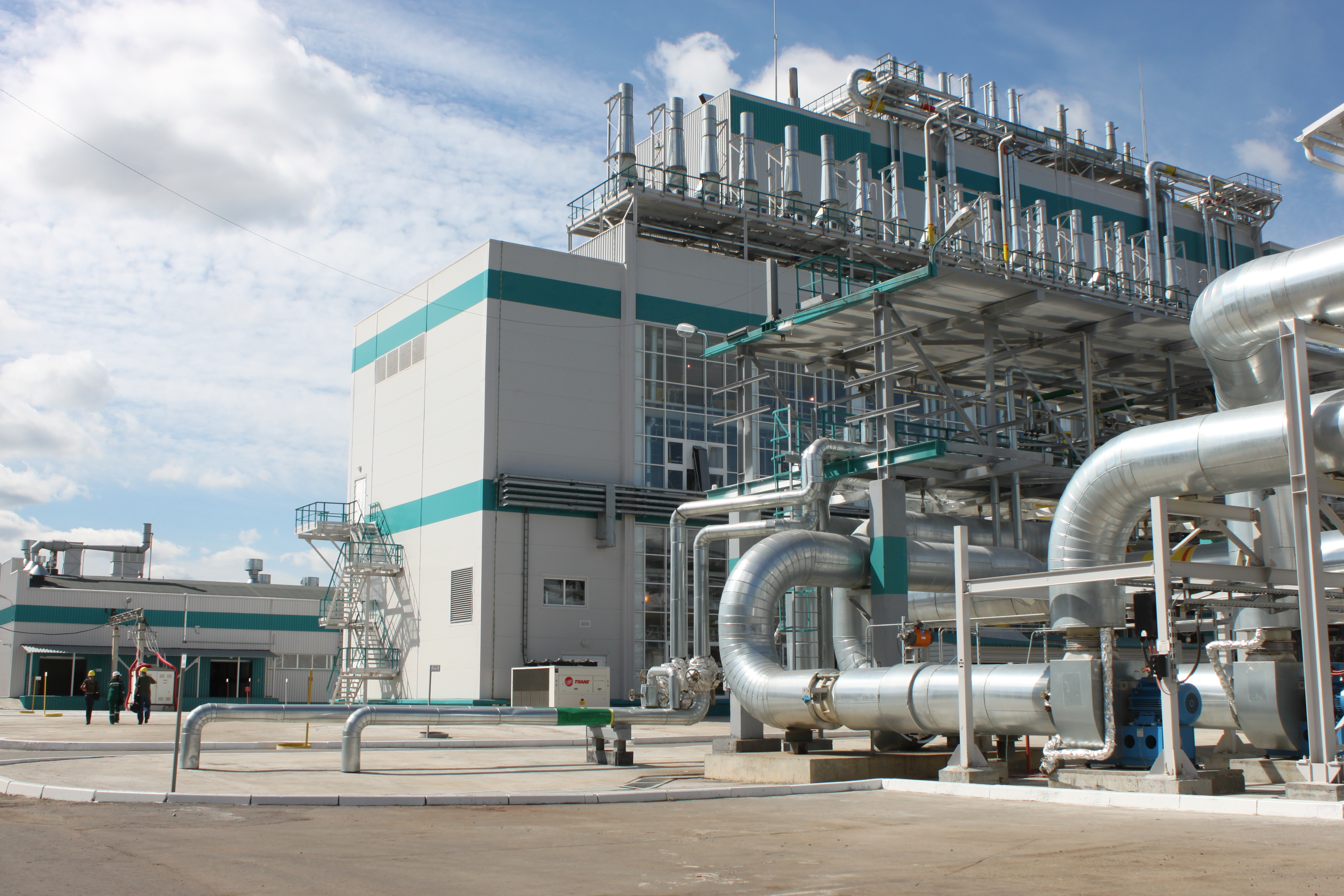
Polystyrene production unit at Sibur-Khimprom

==== Plastics, elastomers and organic synthesis facilities ====
- Sibur-Neftekhim (100%)
- Sibur-Khimprom (100%)
- Polief (100%)
- Sibur-PETF (100%)
- Voronezhsintezkauchuk (100%)
- Nizhnekamskneftekhim (83%) (through SIBUR RT)
- Krasnoyarsk Synthetic Rubber Plant (100%, JV with SINOPEC through Sibur-Sinopec Rubber Holding Company Limited, 74.99%)
- Reliance Sibur Elastomers Private Limited (25.10%) (joint venture with Reliance Industries Limited).

== History ==
=== Background ===
AK Sibur, the group's predecessor, was established by government decree in March 1995. The integration was underpinned by the production cooperation of petrochemical enterprises from the former Soviet Union (FSU), while Gazprom became the driving force of petrochemical asset consolidation around SIBUR. Although petrochemicals were not its core business, the gas company embarked on the mission set by the government to create a powerful national player in the deep hydrocarbon conversion market.

In 1995, the new company absorbed gas processing plants and infrastructure assets of Sibneftegazpererabotka; Permsky Gas Processing Plant producing petrochemical products and NIPIgaspererabotka, a design institute.

In 1998, in addition to Gazprom, entrepreneur Yakov Goldovsky became a co-owner and head of SIBUR. Towards the end of 1998, AK Sibur started its transformation into a vertically integrated petrochemical holding with a full production chain from the processing of raw materials through to the manufacture of finished goods. AK Sibur subsequently built up assets by buying stakes in petrochemical companies all over Russia, including some 60 companies. As a result, the company accumulated huge debts in excess of US$1 bn with no finance to repay them.

By 2001, Gazprom had acquired a 51% stake in AK Sibur, thus gaining control of the company. In 2003, Alexander Dyukov was appointed as the chief executive officer (CEO) of AK Sibur, and a new management team was formed. Under new management, the company improved its operational and financial results and reached an agreement with its creditors.

=== Reorganization ===
In 2005, in accordance with a debt restructuring plan, AK Sibur established SIBUR Holding (whose legal successor is today's SIBUR), which consolidated all the assets of AK Sibur. A 25% interest in SIBUR was sold to Gazprom, and the remaining 75% was sold to Gazprombank, while the proceeds were used to repay the debt owed to Gazprom. In December 2005, AK Sibur Holding was renamed SIBUR Holding.

In 2007, Gazprom, as part of its strategy to exit from non-core businesses, disposed of its interest in the company by selling its 25% stake to the Gazfond private pension fund. In 2008, Gazprombank attempted to sell its 75% stake in the group as a part of a management buyout. However, the sale was not completed due to the unavailability of financing. In a series of transactions completed between November 2010 and November 2011, Leonid Mikhelson, a Russian entrepreneur and a co-owner of NOVATEK, acquired a controlling stake in the group. That same year energy trader Gennady Timchenko, ex-co-owner of Gunvor trading house, acquired a 37.5% stake in SIBUR. Between 2012 and 2017, there were several changes in shares. In 2013 member of Board Kirill Shamalov bought 3.8% shares of the company. As a result, Mikhelson's equity interest totalled 42.23% of the Group's share capital, Timchenko's stake stands at 17%, Kirill Shamalov has 3.9%; Chinese Sinopec and Silk Road Fund got 10% each and the total stake of current and former managers amounted to 10.6%.

Since 2011, SIBUR completed a number of selective divestments, selling its tyre and mineral fertiliser businesses. Instead, the company focused on investing in polymers. At the end of December 2011, SIBUR exited SIBUR-Russian Tyres, having sold a 75% stake to the company's management and the remaining stake to the partners of Vadim Gurinov, the CEO of SIBUR-Russian Tyres. At the end of December 2011, SIBUR sold its mineral fertiliser assets to Uralchem (Mineral Fertilisers, Perm) and Siberian Business Union (Kemerovo Azot and Angarsk Azotno-Tukovy Zavod).

=== Expansion ===
After the decision has been made to focus on polymer business the company started investing into the expansion of the midstream infrastructure, which, once in place, would provide the necessary feedstock for SIBUR's polymer facilities. Overall, between 2012 and 2019, the Company completed 14 large-scale investment projects, with total capital expenditures amounting to 210 billion roubles. The expansion and modernisation of its assets allowed the company to capitalise on growth opportunities in both gas processing and petrochemical markets in Russia. The new strategy was supported by the rebuilding of the company's management in 2016, replacement of a CFO and the devolving of power to regional operations. It provides more efficient way of management when important solutions can be made operatively without long way of approval from central office.

==== Midstream ====
The first expansion stage included the construction of an extensive transport infrastructure, including pipelines to deliver APG, as well as an increase in gas processing fractionation capacities.

In 2012, the Yuzhno-Balykskiy gas processing plant launched a low-temperature condensation and rectification unit.

In 2014, SIBUR completed construction of the linear part of the Purovsky GCP–Tobolsk–Neftekhim product pipeline, which has a total length of 1,100 kilometres.

In 2014, SIBUR commissioned the second fractionation unit, which made the total capacity of the Tobolsk site hit 6.6 mtpa up from 3.8 mtpa in 2011. In 2016, SIBUR completed another project aimed at further expansion of the gas fractionation capacity in Tobolsk from 6.6 to 8 million tonnes a year.

In 2016, Stage 2 of the Vyngapurovsky GPP was commissioned.

As a result, SIBUR's gas processing capacity grew to 25 bcm in 2016, while the recovery of desired fractions in APG processing increased to over 90% in 2016.

==== Petrochemicals ====
===== Polyolefins =====
In 2013, SIBUR launched a new world-class polypropylene (PP) plant in Tobolsk (previously named Tobolsk-Polymer), one of the largest PP facilities globally and No 1 in the Commonwealth of Independent States (CIS). With an annual capacity of 500 kilotonnes of PP, the plant significantly increased the Group's polyolefins production capacity.

In 2014, production was started at the RusVinyl plant.

That same year, SIBUR made a final investment decision to proceed with ZapSibNeftekhim (ZapSib) – the largest state-of-the-art petrochemical facility in Russia and one of the five largest global investment projects in the petrochemical industry. The project envisaged greenfield construction of a new world-class petrochemical complex in Tobolsk, within SIBUR's petrochemical hub, that would include an ethylene cracker with an annual capacity of 1.5 million tonnes and polyolefins production (annual PE capacity of 1.5 million tonnes and annual PP capacity of 0.5 million tonnes). Construction started in 2015.

In 2019, the company completed construction and start-up procedures at all of ZapSib's production and processing facilities ahead of schedule, and production of PP and PE got under way.

ZapSib reached 68% production capacity at the end of the first quarter of 2020. During the quarter, ZapSib produced 115,000 tonnes of polypropylene and 259,000 tonnes of polyethylene.

The total investment budget for the ZapSib project was revised downwards from $9.5 billion to approximately $8.8 billion as of 31 March 2020. The Group has already invested $8.2 billion as of 31 March 2020, with residual capital expenditures estimated to be around $0.6 billion. The group had committed credit lines available for the project in the sum of $0.4 billion as of 31 March 2020.

In June 2019, SIBUR and Sinopec signed a distribution agreement to supply PE to China from the group's ZapSibNeftekhim plant. In 2022, the company's revenue amounted to 26 billion rubles.

===== Niche segments and new products =====
In 2012, second phase of AlphaporTM expandable polystyrene production line was officially launched at SIBUR's production site in Perm. The design capacity of the new line is 50,000 tonnes of EPS per year, and with its launch the company's aggregate polystyrene design capacity in Perm has reached 100,000 tonnes per year.

In 2013 SIBUR commissioned its new chemical complex at Voronezh – Thermoplastic Elastomer Production (TEP) Plant. The new plant has increased Sibur's production of TPEs from 35,000t yearly to 85,000t a year. According to the company's webpage, in 2022 the capacity was increased up to 135,000t a year.

In 2018, SIBUR completed the construction phase of the production of TPE at its compounding site in Voronezh, which added an annual capacity of about 50,000 metric tonnes.

In September 2019, SIBUR and Sinopec signed a framework cooperation agreement to produce SEBS (styrene, ethylene and butylenebased block copolymers) and a Memorandum of Understanding to cooperate in nitrile butadiene rubber (NBR) production.

In 2022, SIBUR has launched production with design capacity 45 ktpa production of a maleic anhydride (MAN) production facility at SIBUR Tobolsk. MAN was previously not produced in Russia and domestic demand was covered by imports.

=== Future projects ===
In 2020, SIBUR has begun works on a new major petrochemicals project Amur Gas Chemical Complex.

The Amur GCC project envisages construction of a basic polymer production facility with a total capacity of 2.7 mtpa (2.3 mtpa of polyethylene and 400 ktpa of polypropylene).

SIBUR and Gazprom signed agreements in May 2018 and September 2019, respectively, on long-term ethane (final) and LPG (preliminary) supplies totalling 3.5 million tonnes per annum. Amur GCC will be launched in synch with the gradual ramp-up of Gazprom's Amur Gas Processing Plant to its full capacity, so that the latter could supply ethane and LPG to Amur GCC for processing into high value-added products.

Sinopec got 40% in this project.

In 2018, SIBUR has launched the construction of a maleic anhydride (MAN) production facility at SIBUR Tobolsk. Maleic anhydride is used in the construction, agriculture, automotive, paint and varnish, furniture, pharmaceutical and other industries. It serves as feedstock for films, synthetic fibres, pharmaceuticals, detergents, fuel components and oils. MAN improves the durability of end products, enhances their waterproof properties, resistance to temperature stress and mechanical impacts. With a planned capacity is 45 ktpa, the facility is scheduled to go online in 2021, bringing new high-tech jobs to the market. MAN is currently not produced in Russia and domestic demand is covered by imports.

== Financials and capital markets ==
=== Financials ===
Type	2015	2016	2017	2018	2019	2020
Revenue, million roubles (according to International Financial Reporting Standards (IFRS))	▲379,852	▲411,812	▲454,619	▲568,647	▼531 306	▼523,010
EBITDA, million roubles	▲135,635	▲139,629	▲160,851	▲201,007	▼170,020	▲179,189
EBITDA margin, %	▲35.7%	▼33.9%	▲35.4%	▼35.3%	▼32.0%	▲34.3%
Assets, million roubles (according to IFRS)	▲846,805	▲886,225	▲1,083,826	▲1,258,646	▲1,462,018	▲1,556,922
Dividends, million roubles (according to company information)	▼7,058	▲9,367	▲14,704	▲22,786	▼17,558	▲28,690
Net debt, million roubles (as of 31 December) (according to IFRS)	▲285,066	▼281,178	▼263,888	▲317,628	▲362,296	▲403,247
Equity, million roubles (as of 31 December) (according to IFRS)	▲258,707	▲356,738	▲457,158	▲540,464	▲639,583	▼631,649

=== Bond issues ===
In 2013, SIBUR first entered the global debt capital market, placing its debut eurobond, due in 2018, raising $1 billion in gross proceeds. In October 2017, the company successfully completed an offering of $500 million in eurobonds due in 2023. In October 2018, the Group bought back approximately US$192 million of its notes due 2018 in a tender offer.

On 23 September 2019, the group floated $500 million in five-year eurobonds on the Irish Stock Exchange. The bonds are due in 2024 with an annual interest rate of 3.45%. Total demand exceeded $1.3 billion. The offering saw the company's bonds purchased by global investors, more than half of whom were not Russian. On 1 July 2020, the company had raised US$500 m following the offering of 5-year Eurobonds on the Irish Stock Exchange. The coupon rate is 2.95%, which is a record low for Russian corporate issuers.

In 2021, SIBUR has become Russia's first petrochemical company to sign a loan with an interest rate which is tied to its sustainability performance.

Besides eurobonds, SIBUR organised a RUB 15 bn BO-01 and BO-02 series exchange-traded bond placement. The semi-annual coupon rate of the BO-01 and BO-02 bonds was fixed at 5.50%, making it the lowest-ever rate for a market placement by a Russian corporate issuer. On 7 July 2021, SIBUR organized a RUB 10 bn BO-03 series exchange-traded bond placement. The books closed at the lower end of the final guidance range, with the coupon set at 7.65% per annum and the issue enjoying best-in-class distribution at this coupon rate. The issue achieved the narrowest spread to OFZs (ruble-denominated Russian Treasury bonds) on the local bond market in the company's history.

=== Credit ratings ===
In February 2018, the credit rating agency Moody's upgraded SIBUR's rating to Baa3.

In June 2019, Fitch Ratings upgraded SIBUR's rating to BBB− from BB+, judging the company's outlook to be stable.

In August 2019, Standard & Poor's gave SIBUR a BBB− rating. As a result, the company now has investment-grade credit ratings from all of the Big Three credit rating agencies.

In May 2020, Standard & Poor's affirmed SIBUR's credit ratings at investment grade and revised outlook to negative which indicated the risk of a delayed recovery in petrochemical pricing in 2021. In June 2021, Fitch and Moody's affirmed SIBUR's credit ratings at investment grade with outlook stable.

=== Initial public offering ===
Rumours of an initial public offering (IPO) have been reported in the media numerous times. By the end of July 2018, it became clear that the SIBUR was considering an IPO. Several sources in the sector reported that SIBUR was holding talks with banks about an offering. Discussions involved floating 10–15% of the company's shares. In September 2018, Dmitry Konov suggested that the company might list 15% of its shares in the second quarter of 2019.

In June 2019, Konov announced that the long-anticipated IPO would take place no sooner than 2020 and suggested Moscow as the main venue for the listing. In February 2020, Konov stated that he did not believe the IPO would be held in 2020 due to the current economic climate. In April 2021 Sibur and TAIF have announced a consolidation of their petrochemical businesses. Konov stated the IPO would not take place until the deal is closed.

In the event an IPO takes place, SIBUR's shares could become a new blue-chip stock in the Russian market.

== Acquisitions ==
In 2009, SIBUR acquired a 50% stake in BIAXPLEN, a Russian producer of BOPP films. In March 2012, SIBUR gained control of the BIAXPLEN group of companies by increasing its stake from 50% to 100%. At the time of the acquisition, production facilities belonging to the BIAXPLEN group comprised three plants located in the Nizhny Novgorod, Kursk and Moscow regions with a total annual capacity of 78,000 metric tonnes of commodity films.

In 2011, SIBUR acquired JSC Acrylate, the only CIS-based producer of acrylic acid and its esters, from ATEK Group.

In July 2019, SIBUR and Gazprom Neft consolidated 100% of the authorised capital in Poliom, a polypropylene plant in Omsk. Sibgazpolimer, a joint venture between the two companies, has signed an agreement to acquire a 50% stake in Poliom from the Titan Group.

In November 2019, Tatneft completed the purchase of SIBUR's petrochemical facilities in Tolyatti (SIBUR Togliatti and JSC Togliattisintez).

In April 2021, Sibur bought a controlling stake in oil and gas refiner company TAIF with a view to consolidate the assets. The deal sets to be closed by the end of September 2021, while the merge of Sibur and TAIF is inspecting by European Commission.

In October 2021, Sibur bought petrochemical and energy assets of TAIF group and united them under SIBUR RT management company, the deal has been approved by European Commission. TAIF brand remained under the control of its historical owners and comprises entities, including refining among them, that has not been included in the deal. The whole TAIF group is appraised at 26,8 billion dollars, its majority interest – at 4 billion dollars, and the rest of the shares – at 3 billion dollars. The deal should also reduce stakes of Sibur's majority stakeholders. The share of Leonid Mikhelson – from 36 to 31%, Gennady Timchenko – from 17 to 14.45%, the stake of current and ex-top-management – from 14,5 to 12,325%, Sogaz – from 12,5 to 10,625%, Silk road Fund and Sinopec – from 10 to 8.5%.

== Corporate affairs ==
In 2015, the company welcomed its first foreign investor after a deal was closed in December that made Sinopec a strategic investor in SIBUR with the purchase of a 10% stake from SIBUR's shareholders. The deal was one of the first steps in building a long-standing relationship between the Russian and Chinese companies.

In January 2017, the Silk Road Fund, a Chinese investment fund, acquired a 10% stake in SIBUR from SIBUR's shareholders.

In July 2020, the company revised its dividend policy for the period starting from 2020, increasing dividend payouts from 35% of net profit to not less than 50% of adjusted net profit.

== Partnerships and Cooperation ==
In June 2007, SIBUR established RusVinyl, a 50/50 joint venture with SolVin Holding Nederland. The joint venture was established to construct a polyvinyl chloride (PVC) plant with an annual capacity of 330 kilotonnes of PVC and 225 kilotonnes of caustic soda.

In February 2012, SIBUR entered into a joint venture arrangement with Reliance Industries Limited, which established a joint venture called Reliance Sibur Elastomers Private Limited, in which SIBUR owns a 25.1% stake. The joint venture was established for the development of a butyl rubber production facility in India with an annual capacity of 120 kilotonnes. It started production in 2015 and become operational in 2020. Now this is the region's first butyl rubber halogenation plant. In addition, Sibur agreed to share proprietary butyl rubber technology, staff training and access to the complex equipment of polymerization reactors, which is unprecedented for a Russian company and marks a unique case of partnership between the two countries.

In August 2013, SIBUR and China Petroleum and Chemical Corporation (Sinopec) entered into a joint venture developed on the site of the Krasnoyarsk Synthetic Rubber Plant (KZSK), where Sinopec purchased a stake of 25% plus one share in KZSK.

In 2018, SIBUR Group established a 50/50 joint venture, PTC, with SG-Trans, a major Russian railway operator.

In September 2019, the group acquired a 50% stake in Manucor, which became a 50/50 joint venture between the Group and PS Film, a member of the PillarStone Fund, a BOPP films producer located in Italy. In 2023, SIBUR sold its stake in the business.

On 5 June 2019, SIBUR and Sinopec signed a Term sheet for a potential Joint Venture that could be based at Amur Gas Chemical Complex. Subject to SIBUR's final investment decision, Sinopec is expected to have a 40% share in the JV. The final investment decision for the project is still under consideration and is dependent on Sinopec's entering the joint venture and Russian government's decision to implement a negative excise tax on ethane and LPG. The Ministry of Finance is finalizing the text of the draft amendments to the Tax Code. In its extended configuration Amur GCC is projected to operate a world-scale cracker together with polyolefin units with a total capacity of 2.7 mtpa (2.3 million tonnes of PE and 0.4 million tonnes of PP). In September 2019, SIBUR signed a gas supply deal with Gazprom, which would allow Amur plant to increase potential output by 80% to reach the extended configuration.

In April 2021 SIBUR announced merger with another key company on the Russian petrochemical market – Tatarstan based holding TAIF. After the merger is completed, the united company will become one of the TOP-5 world's petrochemical companies according to experts.

In December 2021, RusVinyl plant got a new CEO, Marc-Andre Lahalle, as a substitute for Guenther Nadolny after 10 years of service of leadership of the German top-manager. The new CEO has been already worked for the joint venture of Sibur and "Solvay" from 2009 to 2014 as deputy CEO and as production director as well, before moving to Solvay Indupa in Brazil and in Argentina and also to Solvay Silica as COO. As per Guenther Nadolny, he's retiring from active business career.

=== Ownership ===
According to sources, as of 2022, the share of Leonid Mikhelson was 31%, Gennady Timchenko –14.45%, the stake of current and ex-top-management- 12,325%, Sogaz –10,625%, Silk road Fund and Sinopec –8.5% both.

In December 2021, Mubadala Investment Company confirmed the purchase of 1.9% of SIBUR Holding, its local partner, being the biggest investment of the state-owned fund in Russian economy.

Management Board PJSC SIBUR Holding:

- Mikhail Karisalov, member of the Management Board
- Sergey Komyshan, member of Management Board
- Alexey Kozlov, member of the Management Board
- Sergey Lukichev, member of the Management Board
- Oleg Makarov, member of the Management Board
- Vasiliy Nomokonov, member of the Management Board
- Ruslan Shigabutdinov, member of the management board.

== Awards and prizes ==
In 2019, SIBUR ranked 39th in the ICIS Top 100 Chemical Companies Rating by revenue.

SIBUR is one of the best employers in Russia – the hh.ru rating of Russian employers ranked the company third among the country's 100 best employers in 2019.

Between 2012 and 2017, SIBUR demonstrated the highest increase (+54%) in labour productivity among Russian companies according to ACRA Rating Agency.

Randstad's rating recognises SIBUR as the most attractive employer in the chemical industry.

SIBUR received an international Customer eXperience World Award in the "Best customer experience in b2b" category among industrial companies in 2020 and 2021.

== See also ==
- Petroleum industry in Russia
