= Dmitry Konov =

Russian business executive (born 1970)

- Дми́трий Влади́мирович Ко́нов
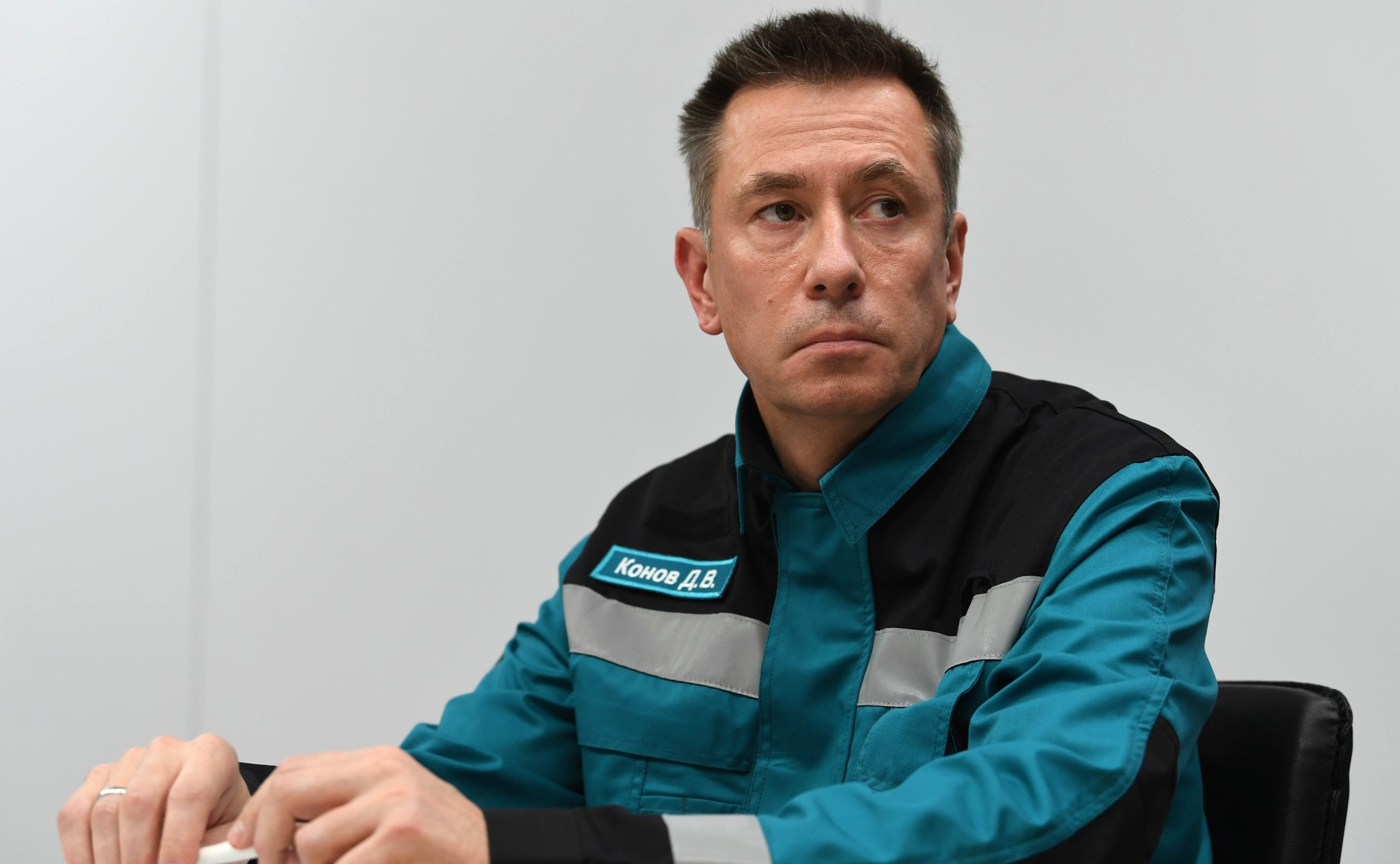
- Born: 1970 (age 55–56); Moscow, Russian SFSR, Soviet Union
- Education: Moscow State Institute of International Relations (MGIMO)
- Occupation: business executive
- Known for: former head of Sibur

Dmitry Vladimirovich Konov (Russian: Дми́трий Влади́мирович Ко́нов; born 2 September 1970, Moscow) is a Russian business executive. He was the head of Sibur, Russia's largest integrated petrochemical company, from 2006 to 2022.

== Biography ==
Dmitry Konov was born in Moscow. His father worked as a geodesist mapper, which involved extensive travel across Russia and contractual trips abroad. His mother was an expert at the Joint Institute for High Temperatures of the Russian Academy of Sciences. Konov attended a school that placed a special emphasis on English language training. He later graduated from the Moscow State Institute of International Relations (MGIMO). In 1988, he was conscripted into the Soviet Army, where he achieved the rank of sergeant, and served in Baku during a period of military unrest in the country.

Konov worked as a trader at the MFK Bank (1994–1997) and at Renaissance Capital (1997–1998). He later moved to the Treasury Department of the YUKOS Oil Company (1998–2000). In 2001, he received an МВА from IMD Business School in Switzerland. The same year, he became Vice President Head of the Investment Banking Department, and managing director of the Corporate Finance Division at Trust and Investment Bank (renamed Trust Bank since 2003).

== SIBUR ==
In 2004, Konov joined the Sibur petrochemical holding as advisor to its president Alexander Dyukov. According to Konov, the company was in bad shape at the time, but he saw that it offered significant potential for growth and accepted the job offer.

Konov held various positions at SIBUR, including Vice President for Strategic Development and Analysis, Vice President for Corporate Policy and Strategy, Senior Vice President for Corporate Policy and Strategy, and Senior Vice President for Business Development – Head of the Plastics and Organic Synthesis Division. He was tasked with leading the restructuring of the company's assets and debt at a time when SIBUR owed $2.5 billion in corporate debt to Gazprom. In less than a year, cross ownership was renounced and agreements with creditors were made, at which point Konov de facto took charge. He converted the company's debt into shares owned by former creditors, enabling the working capital to be invested rather than paid out. Konov had a hand in SIBUR's development strategy as presented to Gazprom's board of directors in 2005, which shaped the new structure of the company. Konov was later known as one of the 'architects' of the holding company.

Upon his departure from the company, Alexander Dyukov recommended Konov for appointment as president. Konov became the president of SIBUR in 2006.

=== President ===
In the spring of 2008, Konov and four of his deputies made an offer to SIBUR's owner Gazprombank regarding a company buyout. The transaction was estimated at some RUB 53.5 billion, which would have made it the biggest MBO in Russian history. However, due to the 2008 financial crisis, the sale did not take place. In 2011, the company was sold to Leonid Mikhelson.

When Konov joined SIBUR, the company consisted of several dozen Soviet-era factories processing oil and gas by-products into various low-margin chemical products. Konov led a change in strategy to reposition SIBUR as a petrochemicals company specializing in high-margin plastics production for the global market. In 2015–2016, SIBUR opened up to international investors by selling a 10% stake to China's Sinopec. China's Silk Road Fund bought another 10% stake in the company.

Between 2012 and 2014, SIBUR completed a number of large-scale investment projects: a pipeline from the Yamal-Nenets Autonomous Area to Tobolsk, the construction of Russia's largest polymer facilities in the Nizhny Novgorod Region, Tobolsk, Bashkiria and Voronezh, and an LPG transshipment terminal in Ust-Luga.

By 2015, SIBUR was at the top of Forbes's list of Russian producers by import substitution; by 2019, the company significantly reduced the share of imports in the domestic consumption of polypropylene, PVC, PET and polystyrene.

SIBUR invested heavily into current repairs and maintenance of the facilities' fixed assets.

By 2016, the company's value stood at $13.8 billion compared to zero in 2003.

=== Chairman of the Management Board ===
From 2018, Konov served as Chairman of SIBUR's management board, focusing on the company's strategic tasks: digitalisation, circular economy development and business globalization.

In 2018, together with Reliance (one of India's largest local manufacturers), Konov initiated the construction of a rubber production plant. Notably, this was the first time the SIBUR company licensed Russian intellectual technologies in India.

Under Konov's management, SIBUR entered a period of active digital transformation: VR technologies began to be deployed enabling distant control over production processes and the operation of industrial equipment. The Amur GCC is a digital facility with automated control or remote maintenance of most processes. This setup could reduce the number of employees by at least half in comparison to Zapsibneftekhim. SIBUR was among the first companies, both globally and in Russia, to integrate a digital modeling system into petrochemical production by launching a high-precision project for modeling physical and chemical processes inside its low-density polyethylene reactor.

As part of SIBUR's management team, Konov also transformed the company into an environmental leader in its industry and home country. In 2019, SIBUR became one of the first Russian companies to adopt a sustainable development strategy. Since 2020, it has focused on reducing carbon emissions and using recycled materials, including developing production of 'green' PET granules from recycled food packaging. In 2021, Sibur launched a net-zero collaboration platform with the WEF and global industry players to promote solutions to climate change. Forbes ranked Sibur among the top-10 environmentally friendly companies in Russia in 2021.

In March 2022, the EU and the UK imposed sanctions directly against Konov. As a result, he decided to step down as chairman of the management board and left other management bodies of the company. Also he is under UK sanctions for previously holding positions at SIBUR and Alrosa, which he left in March-April 2022. In June 2022, Konov filed an appeal with the EU Court to be removed from the sanction lists, his lawyers arguing that "there is no factual or legal basis" for the sanctions.

=== Other projects ===
He took part in the development of Russia's national framework for safe chemical management, which set the basis for technical and other regulations. For his contributions, he received the Russian Government's Science and Technology Award.

== Wealth ==
In 2017, Forbes listed Konov among the wealthiest people in Russia. Under SIBUR's management incentive programme, he acquired a 4% stake in the company worth $535 million, making it to No. 193 in the Forbes list. Konov has noted that he owes most of his wealth to SIBUR's shares which are not actual money: "They are preserved by SIBUR". In 2018, he sold 0.25% of his stake in SIBUR to the holding's other managers. In 2022, Dmitry Konov sold all his shares in Sibur and ceased to be a minority shareholder.

In one of his interviews, Konov said that he owns a house in Cannes and an apartment in Moscow's Noble Row estate.

== Personal life ==
In 2011, Konov met the model Katarina Konks (born in 1982). They married in 2016 and now have a son.

Konov is keen on basketball and is a fan of the Russian team CSKA. A life-long basketball player, he took part in the Moscow student games as a member of the MGIMO team. While at SIBUR, Konov founded the company's corporate basketball league.
