= Russian Venture Company =

- Type: State Fund of Funds
- Founded: 2006
- Founder: Russian Government
- Headquarters: Moscow
- Key people: Alexander Povalko, CEO of RVC.
- Website: www.rvc.ru/en/

RVC (Russian: Rossijskaja Venchurnaja Kompanija) (JSC) is a state fund of funds and a development institute of the Russian Federation, one of Russia's key tools in building its own national innovation system.

RVC is founded by Russian Government dated June 7, 2006 No. 838-р. In 2015, RVC was assigned the role of the National technology Initiative (NTI) project office – a long term complex program designed to create conditions to ensure leadership of the Russian companies on the new high technology markets which will determine the structure of the global economy in the next 15–20 years.

== Owners and executives ==
Authorized capital of RVC JSC is more than 30,01 billion rubles. One hundred per cent of the RVC capital belongs by the Russian Federation represented by the Federal Agency for Management of State Property of the Russian Federation (Rosimushchestvo).

Members of the Board of Directors

Chairman of the Board of Directors: Oleg V. Fomichev — Deputy Minister of Economic Development of the Russian Federation

- Alexander A. Auzan — Dean of Faculty of Economics in Lomonosov Moscow State University;
- Vasily M. Belov — Senior Vice-President, Innovations development of Skolkovo Foundation;
- Alexander Galitsky — Managing Partner of Almaz Capital venture fund;
- Boris G. Nuraliev — Director of 1C Company;
- Dmitri N. Peskov — Director of "Young Professionals" Agency for Strategic Initiatives;
- Alexander B. Povalko — CEO of RVC;
- Sergey G. Polyakov — General Director of Foundation for Assistance to Small Innovative Enterprises (FASIE);
- Yuri A. Udaltsov — Deputy Chairman of the Executive Board, RUSNANO Management Company LLC.

The Management Board

The number of Board members cannot be less than five people.

- Alexander Povalko — CEO of RVC;
- Sergey Abdykerov — Operational Director of the National Technology Initiative project office;
- Mikhail Antonov — Deputy CEO, Director for Innovative Infrastructure Development;
- Mikhail Fedotov — Deputy CEO, Financial Director;
- Anna Romanenko — Deputy CEO, Managing Director;
- Alexey Basov — Deputy General Director — Investment Director of RVC JSC;
- Kumanina Ekaterina — Director for Strategic Communications of RVC JSC;
- Elena Mikheeva — Director of Risk Analysis and Internal Control Department at RVC JSC, a member of the Management Board of RVC JSC.

== Activities ==
The state together with Skolkovo Fund, Rusnano JSC and Vnesheconombank designate RVC as development institutution of the Russian Federation, i.e. "instruments designed to solve state tasks in the market environment".

According to the development strategy for 2017-2030 RVC works in three main directions: investment activity as a fund of the funds, development of innovation and National Technology Initiative, venture capital market development. Company focuses on support of the technology entrepreneurs whose projects address roadmaps and cross-platform technologies of the National Technology Initiative.

Starting 2016, RVC fulfils functions of the NTI project office (Order of the Government of the Russian Federation dated April 18, 2016) No. 317: performs project management, provides organizational, technical, expert and analytical support, information and financial support for the development and implementation of NTI roadmaps and projects.

=== Investments ===
The Investment activity of RVC is aimed at increasing the supply of venture capital through the creation of new funds jointly with its partners: private, institutional and foreign investors, as well as large corporations. At the suggestion of market participants, RVC invests in venture capital funds and initiates the creation of new funds with the involvement of professional investors and managers. According to the updated investment strategy RVC product portfolio will consist of 6 categories of the funds:

· classic venture funds;

· young managers funds (1st time GP);

· late-stage funds;

· early stage funds supporting NTI;

· corporate funds;

· foreign venture funds

=== RVC-backed funds ===
In 2018-2020 RVC planned to establish up to 10 new funds in total. Now, the company manages 26 funds, three of which were established in 2018. The total assets under management of the funds are 48.8 billion roubles. RVC share is 26.6 billion roubles.

The first funds were established in 2007-2008 in the form of closed-end funds (CE VF) where RVC had 49% share, then in the form of LLC, now – in the form of the investment partnership.

Associated funds

- RVC Seed Fund (RUB 1,980 mn.)
- Civil Technology (RUB 1,000 mn)
- RVC Infrafund (RUB 2,000 mn)
- RVC Biofund (RUB 1,500 mn)

Funds in Foreign Jurisdictions

- RVC I LP (Great Britain) (USD 60,69 mn)
- RVC IVFRT LP (Great Britain) (USD 40 mn)

Funds established in the form of Closed-End Funds

- Bioprocess Capital Ventures (RUB 3,000 mn)
- Maxwell Biotech Venture Fund (RUB 1,224,4 mn)
- Leader Innovations Venture Fund (RUB 3,000 mn)
- S-Group Ventures Venture Fund (RUB 1,800 mn)
- VTB – Venture Fund (RUB 3,061 mn)

Funds established in the form of Investment Partnership Agreement (IPA)
Industry funds

- Finematika Aerospace Fund IPA (RUB 1,515 mn)
- Pre-ipo-fund-ipa/Pre-IPO Fund IPA] (RUB 3,788.7 mn)
- North Energy Fund I Seed IPA (RUB 923.3 mn)
- Phystech Ventures II IPA (RUB 900 mn)
- Russian-Belorussian Venture Investment Fund IPA
- Venture Fund of Skolkovo — Industrial I IPA (RUB up to 3 bln)
- Venture Fund of Skolkovo — IT I IPA (RUB up to 3 bln)

Micro-funds

- Softline Seed Fund IPA (RUB 136 mn)
- High-Tech Seed Fund IPA (RUB 133,2 mn)
- Venture Accelerator Fund IPA (RUB 33,4 mn)
- ACP Seed Fund IPA (RUB 133,4 mn)
- Life Sciences Seed Fund IPA (RUB 33,4 mn)
- Seed fund of Tomsk State University IPA (RUB 33,4 mn)

=== Venture market development ===
RVC development strategy for 2017 - 2030 determines company mission – a development of the mature venture capital market through the consolidation and development of resources, competencies and initiatives on the part of investors, investment portfolio managers and entrepreneurs so as to create and promote innovative products and technologies in priority technology areas, making Russia a leader in the global technology market.

In order to implement the mission, RVC facilitates technology transfer, launches acceleration events and educational programs, promotes the innovation activity and develops entrepreneurship communities.

RVC supports Russian technology entrepreneurs in the priority fields: biomedicine, power energy, advanced production technologies, new materials, component base development, quantum technologies, digital technologies in the relevant fields.

Venture capital market development strategy

At the end of 2018, RVC together with the Ministry of economic development of the Russian Federation presented a draft of the Strategy of development of venture capital market and direct investments for the period till 2018 and further perspective till 2030. According to the strategy, by 2030, the volume of deals on the national venture capital market should reach 410 billion RUB, which is 29 times greater than in 2017. Aggregate capital offer on the venture capital market (total amount of the funds the projects can expect to receive from the venture investors of different categories) should grow by 12.5 times up to 2.73 trillion RUB.

==== The platform for the development of corporate acceleration tools GenerationS ====
The platform for the development of corporate acceleration tools GenerationS is aimed at the development of the high technology projects that are of interest for the Russian and international venture investors. It is held from 2013 with the support of the Russian corporations, development institutions, venture infr astructure representatives. It is first Russian accelerator that was included in the international network Global Accelerator Network (GAN) created by Techstars.

From 2018, GenerationS works as a platform for corporate accelerators. The partner are Airbus, Michelin, VTB, Unilever, Alrosa and others. The projects are searched for in the areas necessary for the corporate partner. In 2018, the accelerator is recognized as the best corporate accelerator in Europe at the international forum Corporate Startup Summit 2018.

Start-ups monitoring from 2013 to 2017 demonstrated that total volume of investments in the graduates reached 2.4 billion RUB.

The Open Innovations Forum

The Open Innovations Forum is an annual forum devoted to new technologies and perspectives of international cooperation in the field of innovation. This is a global discussion venue designed to demonstrate results, achievements, exchange of experience between the scientific community, business and authorities.

The forum is held from 2012 by the leading Russian development institutions. RVC is one of the organizers and intellectual partner of a number of panel discussions.

==== "TechUp" Rating of the fast-growing high-tech companies ====
National rating of the fast-growing high-tech companies "TechUp" was organized by RVC in partnership with the Association of Innovative Regions of Russia (AIRR) in 2012 with support of Rosnano and FASIE. In 2013, PwC joined as the partner. In 2014, MSP Bank (SME Bank) became a partner as well. In 2015, National Research University "Higher School of Economics" was included in partners. In 2016, the rating was selected as a base for the priority project of the Ministry of economy "National Champions".

==== National Champions ====
National Champions project is designed to ensure advanced growth of the national private high technology export-oriented companies-leaders and form on their basis. The project started in 2016. 62 high technology companies participated in it. Ministry of economic development of the Russian Federation assist with the development of advanced growth strategies and use of the existing support measures to the maximum extent, assists in overcoming the administrative barriers, helps to interact with the authorities, development institutions and financial organizations in concierge-service mode.

==== Basic Department of RVC in MIPT Management of Technology Projects ====
RVC specialized department in MIPT "Technological projects management", Masters program for the bachelor graduates of the science departments (physics, chemistry, biology and other) where natural-science education is amplified with business training. Analytic specialists for the venture funds, innovation specialists and technological entrepreneurs are trained under this program. In 2018, RVC together with the MFTU laboratory of neural systems and deep learning and MFTU-Sberbank laboratory launched a new mater program related to project management in the field of artificial intelligence.

==== Inter-university training course "Innovative Economy and Technology Entrepreneurs" ====
"Innovative Economy and Technology Entrepreneurs" training course was developed by RVC in 2017 in cooperation with Saint-Petersburg National Research University of Innovation Technology, Mechanics and Optics (ITMO University) and Moscow State University n.a. M.V. Lomonosov License agreement with RVC on inclusion of the course "Innovation economy and technological entrepreneurship" in the training program 2018-2019 were signed by 34 Russian universities from 25 regions. It is expected that by 2020 the number of universities-operators will reach 100 and about 50 thousand students will complete the training.

==== Venture capital market analysis ====
Support of the analytical projects in venture industry is aimed at increase of objectivity and creation and development of the system of standards according to which analytical information about the venture industry should be provided. One of the most important researches "MoneyTreeTM: Venture market navigator" is held by RVC together with PwC. In 2018, RVC together with the partners delivered the researches: Rating of the Russian venture funds, business-angels and corporations, Venture Barometer 2018 (RVC - general partner), Venture investments 2018.

==== The Tech In Media Contest of Innovative Journalism ====
Tech in Media is an innovative journalism contest organized to motivate professional media community to pay more attention to science, high tech and venture entrepreneurship. In 2018, contest winners were selected in four specialized tracks: "Venture Business", "Life Science", "Philanthropy and Technology" and "Hydrogen Energy" Applications for participation were submitted by 610 authors, 48 best authors were selected by the expert council.

==== Support of the venture capital industry events ====
RVC supports of the Russian and Kazan venture capital fairs, Siberian venture capital fair, Venture capital investment forum, Moscow corporate venture summit and others.

=== National Technology Initiative ===
RVC JSC is charged with functions of the National Technology Initiative project office. The project office performs project management, provides organizational, technical, expert and analytical support, information and financial support of development and implementation of NTI roadmaps and projects.

Today, eight roadmaps are approved within NTI framework, 11 task forces for NTI markets operate, the following projects "NTI Centres of Competence", "Up Great technology contests", "NTI University 20.35", "NIT Plympiad" and other are implemented. In 2019, at least three NTI roadmaps will be updated.

In July 2018, long-term NTI implementation plan for the period of 2018-2021 was approved.

In order to ensure regulatory support for NTI implementation, 7 regulatory roadmaps for Technet, Marinet, Autonet, Aeronet, Energynet, Healthnet and Neuronet were approved by the order of the Government of the Russian Federation in 2018. The documents include step-by-step measures aimed at elimination of the regulatory barriers for NTI markets development.

RVC portfolio includes five venture funds that are focused on support of the National Technology Initiative projects - they are three joint funds with "Skolkovo", with Far East Development Fund and "Rusnano", as well as NTI Fund.

15.6 billion roubles were allocated for funding of the NTI projects from the date of launch; this amount includes 8.7 billion of the state subsidies. Total number of supported projects as of December 2018 is 39. Funding in the form of grants was distributed by the Fund for assistance to innovation - money were received by 406 projects under the programs "Umnik-NTI", "Development-NTI", "Start-NTI".

==== Engineering competition NTI Olympiad ====
NTI Olympiad is an annual team engineering competition between the scholars of 7-11 grades that provide privileges on entering universities. The competition is held in a number of profiles related to the National Technology Initiative. Co-organizers - RVC and ASI. Organizing universities are Moscow Polytechnic University, Moscow Aviation Institute, MIPT, MEPhI, ITMO University, MISiS, MSTU n.a. N. E. Bauman.

NTI Olympiad is held from 2016. In 2016, 12 000 scholars submitted applications, in 2017 - more than 20 000 scholars. Application submission is followed by the remote stage - completing of the tests on the website. In order to prepare for the in-person final, the scholars can participate in specialized hackathons. in 2018, the number of applications reached 38 359. A separate track for the students is launched.

==== Up Great technology contests ====
NTI Up Great technology contests is a program launched in Russia that helps to overcome technological barriers on NTI markets. The first tasks of the Russian contests were creation of the unmanned vehicle operating in the difficult weather conditions - "Winter city" and creation of the hydrogen fuel cell element for unmanned aircraft and motor cars - "First Element. Air" and "First Element. Earth".

==== NTI Centres of Competence ====
NTI Centres of Competence are the departments that are created based on the educational and scientific organizations and are engaged in development of the cross-platform NTI technologies including big data, artificial intelligence, and quantum technologies, new portable energy sources, robotics parts, and wireless technologies, virtual and augmented reality. Centres carry out research and educational activity in consortium with the leading technological companies. 14 centres are established in Russia. State support of NTI CC is provided under the order of the Government of the Russian Federation dated October 16, 2017. No. 1251.

==== NTI infrastructure centres ====
In 2018, the process of creation of the NTI infrastructure centres for Technet, Autonet, Aeronet, Energynet, Healthnet, Neuronet and Circle movement is complete. The centres join representatives of the business community for development of the new markets and provision of the expert and analytic services to their participants. Budget financing of the centres in the amount of 628 million roubles is going to be provided during the first three years.

==== NTI Export Accelerator ====
RVC in partnership with PwC launched the "Export Accelerator" of the National Technology Initiative (NTI). The program is aimed at development of the export done by the Russian technological companies that work on NTI markets. More than 60 companies submitted applications for acceleration in the NTI export centre. 15 companies passed to the final accelerator stage: eight companies are specialized in development of the globally oriented products in the field of artificial intelligence, four companies work in the field of internet of things, the other three - in the field of big data. In 2019, new tracks will be launched.

==== National standards in the field of "cross platform technologies" ====
In 2018, Technical committee "Cyber-physical systems" created on the base of RVC together with the market players initiated more than 30 national standards in the field of "cross platform technologies" including projects to the benefit of NTI Energynet, Technet and Safenet. An important committee work area is promotion of the Russian documents on the international level. In October 2018, ISO/IEC experts approved Russian project of the industrial internet of things standard, development of a number of multi-language standards is initiated. In 2018, order of Federal Agency on Technical Regulating and Metrology extended powers of the committee in the field of legal and technical regulation for the account of artificial intelligence and smart power energy areas. At the end of the year, the number of participants of TC "Cyber-physical systems" and its task forces included more than 80 organizations.

==== Forum "NTI Ecosystem: Strategy for the Future" ====
In December 2018, in Sochi, RVC for the first time held the forum "Ecosystem NTI: Strategy for the Future" that joined about 500 participants of the National Technology Initiative community to summarize the year, work over the new initiatives and coordinate joint plans for 2019-2020.
