= RRT Global =

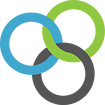
- Industry: petroleum refining
- Founder: Oleg Parputc, Oleg Giiazov
- Headquarters: USA, Russia
- Area served: Worldwide
- Key people: Oleg Giiazov, Dmitry Shalupkin, Douglas Harris,
- Services: R&D, consulting
- Website: www.globalrrt.com

RRT Global is an international company that specializes in the development of technologies for oil refining process. The company's CEO, Douglas Harris, is a former vice president of TNK-BP. The company is a resident of the Energy Efficient Technologies cluster of the Skolkovo Foundation. RRT Global is the first company to implement the conversion of light gasoline fractions in a combined process.

== History ==
The company was founded in St. Petersburg by chemical engineers Oleg Parputs (Russian: Олег Парпуц) and Oleg Giiazov (Russian: Олег Гиязов), who had previously worked in an engineering company that served the oil refining sector. Startup financing was provided by Foresight Ventures, Bright Capital and the Skolkovo Foundation.

The first laboratory was established on the campus of the Saint Petersburg State Institute of Technology. The laboratory was unheated, which meant that researchers had to work there for 6–8 hours in padded jackets.

The company became a resident of the Energy Efficient Technologies cluster of the Skolkovo Foundation in 2011. Douglas Harris, the former Vice President of Refining at BP and TNK-BP, became the company’s CEO in the same year. The company has patented the PRIS technology in Russia, Europe and the United States.

The Prime Minister of the Russian Federation, Dmitry Medvedev, met with the company’s management team in October 2011, and visited the company’s laboratory in September 2012 during his official visit to Saint Petersburg.

The company was rated one of the Top 10 Startups of the Year in 2012 by the Russian Startup Rating.

After conducting a company audit in 2012, PricewaterhouseCoopers awarded the company an AAA rating.

In 2015-2016 RRT Global formed technology alliances with American engineering company KBR and Russian IT company Yandex.

== Management and company structure ==
The company is headquartered in the United States. RRT Global has subsidiary operating in the Russian Federation

RRT Global’s R&D center is located in St. Petersburg. The center includes a pilot plant park, laboratory facilities for studying catalytic systems, an analytical laboratory, and an administrative and logistics center.

The company’s senior management includes Dmitry Shalupkin (CTO), Douglas Harris (CEO), Oleg Giiazov (Director in Russia).

== Technologies ==
One of the company’s areas of focus is to improve the technology to obtain MSAT-2 gasoline components based on combining catalytic systems and refining in a single unit. The company is making extensive use of 3D printing for the production of certain equipment components.

=== PRIS ===

PRIS is a technology developed by the company for converting light gasoline fractions in a combined process. Papers on this technology have been published in the journal Chemical Engineering and Processing, as well as other specialized scientific journals. Worldwide Refinery Processing Review Included the technology in four of the State-of-the-Art commercial isomerization technologies, together with international providers of advanced technologies: UOP, Axens, GTC. Rossiyskaya Gazeta called the technology “revolutionary”.

According to this technology, refining and catalytic systems are combined in a single unit, reducing capital and energy costs and reducing environmental pollution. A similar combination principle had previously been used primarily in the pharmaceutical industry. The PRIS technology allows the use of a low-octane straight-run gasoline fraction with a benzole-containing fraction as raw materials. The technology allows the production of high-octane gasoline components meeting the EURO 5 standard.

=== IC7 ===
IС7 is a technology developed by the company for isomerization product of oil refining, heptanes. Earlier heptanes not found practical applications and have been used as solvents. The technology helps to increase production of high-octane gasoline.

== See also ==
- Oil refinery
- List of oil refineries
- Distillation
