= Retrieval-based Voice Conversion =

Voice conversion software

- Developer: RVC-Project team
- Release: 2023
- Written in: Python
- Operating system: Windows, Linux, macOS
- Available in: English, Simplified Chinese, Japanese, Korean, French, Turkish, Portuguese
- Type: Voice conversion software
- License: MIT License
- Repository: Github

Retrieval-based Voice Conversion (RVC) is an open source voice conversion AI algorithm that enables realistic speech-to-speech transformations, accurately preserving the intonation and audio characteristics of the original speaker.

== Overview ==
In contrast to text-to-speech systems such as ElevenLabs, RVC differs by providing speech-to-speech outputs instead. It maintains the modulation, timbre and vocal attributes of the original speaker, making it suitable for applications where emotional tone is crucial.

The algorithm enables both pre-processed and real-time voice conversion with low latency. This real-time capability marks a significant advancement over previous AI voice conversion technologies, such as So-vits SVC. Its speed and accuracy have led many to note that its generated voices sound near-indistinguishable from "real life", provided that sufficient computational specifications and resources (e.g., a powerful GPU and ample RAM) are available when running it locally and that a high-quality voice model is used.

== Technical foundation ==
Retrieval-based Voice Conversion (RVC) utilizes a hybrid approach that integrates feature extraction with retrieval-based synthesis. Instead of directly mapping source speaker features to the target speaker using statistical models, RVC retrieves relevant segments from a target speech database, aiming to enhance the naturalness and speaker fidelity of the converted speech.

At a high level, the RVC system typically comprises three main components:

1. a content feature extractor, such as a phonetic posteriorgram (PPG) encoder or self-supervised models like HuBERT;
2. a vector retrieval module that searches a target voice database for the most similar speech units;
3. a vocoder or neural decoder that synthesizes waveform output from the retrieved representations.

The retrieval-based paradigm aims to mitigate the oversmoothing effect commonly observed in fully neural sequence-to-sequence models, potentially leading to more expressive and natural-sounding speech. Furthermore, with the incorporation of high-dimensional embeddings and k-nearest-neighbor search algorithms, the model can perform efficient matching across large-scale databases without significant computational overhead.

Recent RVC frameworks have incorporated adversarial learning strategies and GAN-based vocoders, such as HiFi-GAN, to enhance synthesis quality. These integrations have been shown to produce clearer harmonics and reduce reconstruction errors.

== Research developments ==
Research on RVC has recently explored the use of self-supervised learning (SSL) encoders such as wav2vec 2.0 and HuBERT to replace hand-engineered features like MFCCs. These encoders improve content preservation, especially when source and target speakers have dissimilar speaking styles or accents.

Moreover, modern RVC models leverage vector quantization (VQ) methods to discretize the acoustic space, improving both synthesis accuracy and generalization across unseen speakers. For example, retrieval-augmented VQ models can condition the synthesis stage on quantized speech tokens, which enhances controllability and style transfer.

Despite its strengths, RVC still faces limitations related to database coverage, especially in real-time or few-shot settings. Inadequate diversity in the target voice corpus may lead to sub-optimal retrieval or unnatural prosody.

These advances demonstrate the viability of RVC as a strong alternative to conventional deep learning VC systems, balancing both flexibility and efficiency in diverse voice synthesis applications.

== Training process ==
The training pipeline for retrieval-based voice conversion typically includes a preprocessing step where the target speaker's dataset is segmented and normalized. A pitch extractor such as librosa or DDSP-DDC may be used to obtain fundamental frequency (F0) features. During training, the model learns to map content features from the source speaker to the acoustic representation of the target speaker while maintaining pitch and prosody. The training objective often combines reconstruction loss with feature consistency loss across intermediate layers, and may incorporate cycle consistency loss to preserve speaker identity.

Fine-tuning on small datasets is feasible due to the use of pre-trained models, particularly for the SSL encoder and content extractor components. This approach allows transfer learning to be applied effectively, enabling the model to converge faster and generalize better to unseen inputs. Most open implementations support batch training, gradient accumulation, and mixed-precision acceleration (e.g., FP16), especially when utilizing NVIDIA CUDA-enabled GPUs.

== Real-time deployment ==
RVC systems can be deployed in real-time scenarios through WebUI interfaces and streaming audio frameworks. Optimizations include converting the inference graph to ONNX or TensorRT formats, reducing latency. Audio buffers are typically processed in chunks of 0.2–0.5 seconds to ensure minimal delay and seamless conversion. Cross-platform compatibility with tools such as OBS Studio and Voicemeeter enables integration into live streaming, video production, or virtual avatar environments.

== Applications and concerns ==
The technology enables voice changing and mimicry, allowing users to create accurate models of others using only a negligible amount of minutes of clear audio samples. These voice models can be saved as .pth (PyTorch) files. While this capability facilitates numerous creative applications, it has also raised concerns about potential misuse as deepfake software for identity theft and malicious impersonation through voice calls.

== Ethical and legal considerations ==
As with other deep generative models, the rise of RVC technology has led to increasing debate about copyright, consent, and authorship. While some jurisdictions may allow parody or fair use in creative contexts, impersonating living individuals without permission may infringe upon privacy and likeness rights. As a result, some platforms have begun issuing takedown notices against AI-generated voice content that closely mimics celebrities or musicians.

=== In pop culture ===
RVC inference has been used to create realistic depictions of song covers, such as replacing original vocals with characters like Twilight Sparkle and Mordecai to have them sing duets of popular music like "Airplanes" and "Somebody That I Used to Know." These AI-generated covers, which can sound strikingly similar to the voice imitated, have gained popularity on platforms like YouTube as humorous memes.
