= Skolkovo Foundation =

The Skolkovo Foundation is the principal agency, as a part of VEB.RF group (ex-Vnesheconombank), responsible for the Russian Skolkovo Innovation Center, a scientific and technological center for the development and commercialization of advanced technologies. It is a non-profit organization founded in 2010 and charged by Russian president Dmitry Medvedev with creating a new science and technology development center in the Moscow suburb of Skolkovo. The Skolkovo innovation system comprises the Skolkovo Institute of Science and Technology (Skoltech) established in partnership with MIT, corporate R&D centers, business incubators, private seed and venture funds, and start-up companies, as well as residential space and social infrastructure. It is a city with over 30,000 residents and employees.

Skolkovo gave a grant of $780,000 to a company called Workle, which is a service that people can use to start their own Internet-based careers, in 2012. As a result, Workle increased its remote workforce by over 500 percent, according to Yekaterinburg News.

The Skolkovo Foundation has offices in the United States, and U.S. allegations have been raised concerning the true intent behind their activities there. In April 2014, FBI Assistant Special Agent Lucia Ziobro wrote an unusual article in The Boston Business Journal which stated that the FBI suspected that Skolkovo "may be a means for the Russian government to access our nation's sensitive or classified research".

In November 2013, criminal charges were filed in Russia alleging embezzlement and misuse of $1.5 million of Skolkovo Foundation money. Over 200 managers and employees were fired after a corruption investigation regarding the foundation's misuse of government funds.

Skolkovo is governed by a special law that gives its resident companies special economic conditions for running their businesses. Over 2,700 companies from Russia and abroad have received Skolkovo resident status.

In September 2021, the Skolkovo Foundation was assigned through 2024 to be the operator of governmental support for testing AI technologies for top-priority economic sectors, within the framework of the federal Artificial Intelligence project, part of the national Digital Economy program.

== Resident company examples ==
- MultiClet Corp.
- RRT Global
