= Rusnano =

Russian government owned company

- Type: Joint-stock company
- Founded: Moscow, Russia (2007)
- Headquarters: Moscow, Russia
- Key people: Anatoly Chubais (Chairman of the Executive Board and CEO, 2011 - 2020) Sergei Kulikov (CEO, from December 2020)
- Products: Nanomaterials
- Revenue: $25.9 million (2017)
- Operating income: $187 million (2018)
- Net income: −$91 million (2017)
- Total assets: $2.89 billion (2017)
- Total equity: $1.63 billion (2017)
- Number of employees: 470 (2010)
- Website: en.rusnano.com

Rusnano Group (Russian: Роснано АО, lit. 'Rosnano plc.') is a Russian state-established and funded company. The Rusnano Group's mission is to create competitive nanotechnology-based industry in Russia. Rusnano invests directly and through indirect funds into all major knowledge-based areas where nanotechnology is widely implemented: electronics, optics, telecom, classic and renewable energy, healthcare and biotechnology, materials and metallurgy, engineering and chemistry.

== History ==
In April 2007 the Russian President Vladimir Putin has announced an Initiative termed «Strategy for Development of Nanotechnology Industry» in which he outlined the goals of new Russian policy on nanotechnology industry.

The Group was founded in 2011 by reorganizing Russian Corporation of Nanotechnology, into RUSNANO JSC, RUSNANO Management Company LLC and a non-profit Fund for Infrastructure and Educational Programs (FIEP). These separate legal entities work together on increasing competitiveness and effectiveness of Russian companies in nanotechnology-related industrial fields.

In 2015 Rusnano had 16 investment projects, including investments into about 97 plants and R&D companies in 37 regions of Russia. In 2016 many such enterprises were either dissolved, bankrupted or repurposed. In 2016 the company was on the verge of bankruptcy significantly devaluating below the equity levels but managed to recover. As of 2017, 100% shares of Rusnano were owned by the Russian government. In 2020 the government of Russia has merged it with VEB.RF.

On December 3, 2020, Kulikov Sergei (Russian: Куликов Сергей) was appointed as CEO on a five-year term. Trade of company's securities was suspended on Moscow Stock Exchange in November 2021. The same year the company declared net loss of 120 billions rubles, 20 of which were settled, with the rest making into the mid of 2021. In June 2022 the company, led by newly appointed Kulikov, was again on the verge of insolvency. The subsequent October, media learned that the government was considering liquidating Rusnano. The company's position worsened after the introduction of international sanctions against Russia. Significant assets are supposed to be transferred to other state corporations. Finance Minister Anton Siluanov addressed President Vladimir Putin with a proposal to disband Rusnano.

In September 2023, Vladimir Putin said that there was a "big financial hole" in Rusnano. A month later, the corporation announced its inability to pay its obligations and the possibility of bankruptcy. At this point, the government had not yet decided whether to save Rusnano.

== Divisions ==
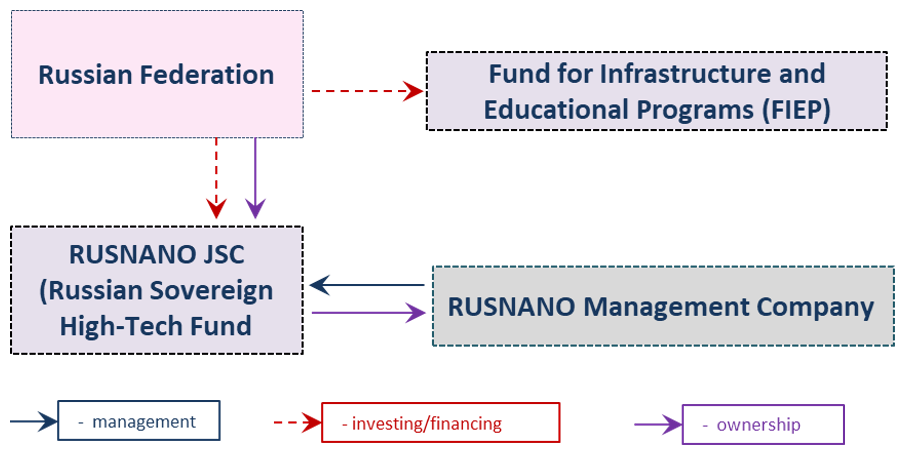
Current structure of RUSNANO Group is presented below

- RUSNANO JSC is a holder of Group's assets, governed by the Board of Directors who are appointed by Russian Government.
- Fund for Infrastructure and Educational Programs (FIEP) was founded in 2013 as a non-profit organization managing various projects targeting creation of innovative nanotechnology-related ecosystem in Russia. All non-profit activities aimed at development of innovative Nano-industry ecosystem were segregated from business units to develop governance and structure of the Group.

=== RUSNANO Management Company ===
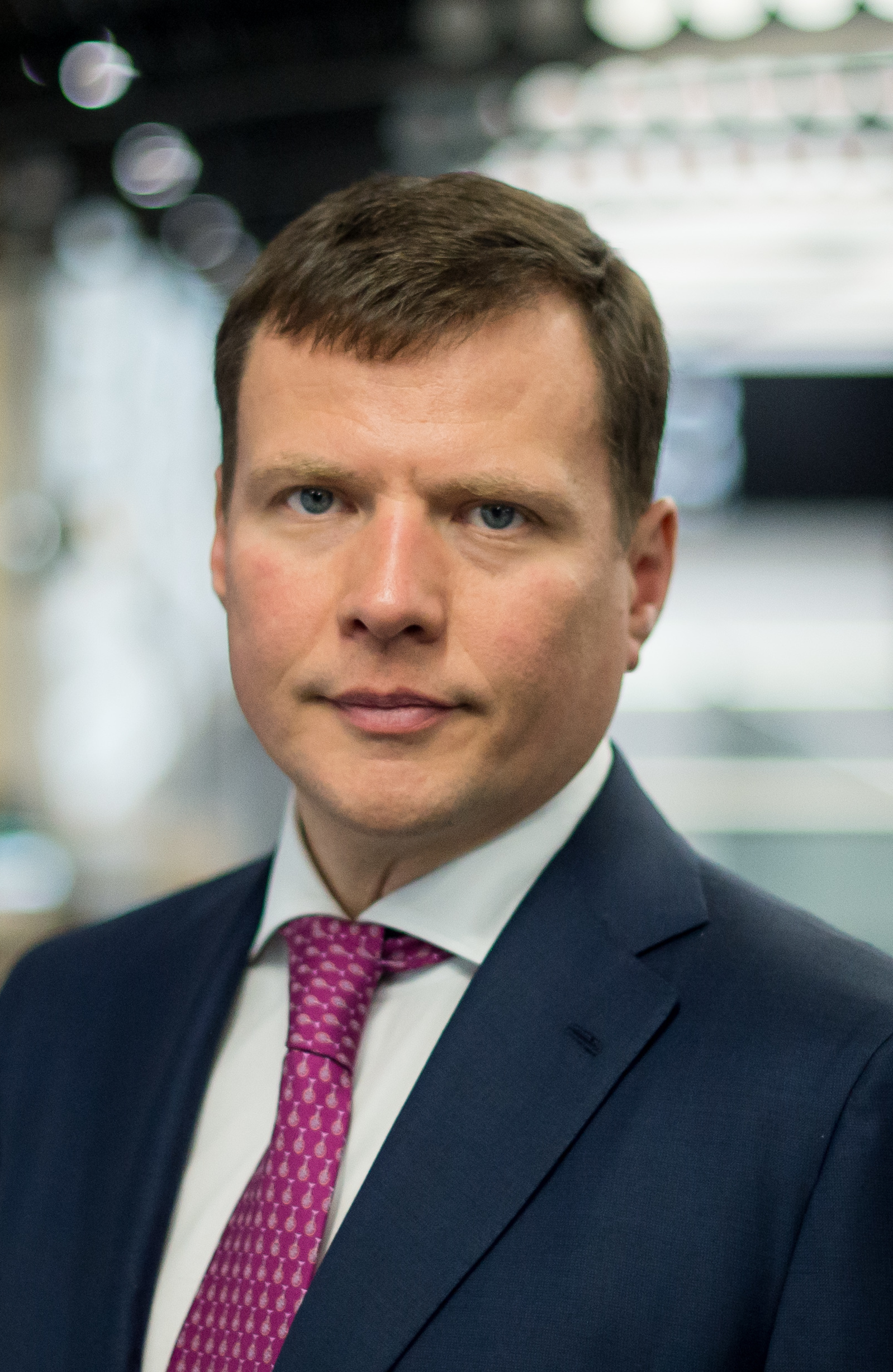
Kulikov Sergei (Russian: Куликов Сергей), chairman since December 2020

RUSNANO Management Company was created in 2013 to manage all JSC RUSNANO's assets, leading business development and investment activities. RUSNANO Management Company is governed by the Executive Board and Board of Directors.

RUSNANO Management Company with combined value of assets under management at around $3 billion. Between 2007 and 2015 it invested into 107 tech portfolio companies, operating in Russia, US, Western Europe, and Israel. RUSNANO Management Company AUM exceeded $4 billion, as of December 31, 2018.

The company manages eight Growth Capital and Venture Capital Funds and raised over $1,5 billion from both private and governmental investors from Russian and abroad with leverage ratio 1:3 from RUSNANO JSC to third-party investors, respectively. These funds are highly diversified by stage, sector, and geography diversifying risks and potentially creating additional value for investors.

Fund	Target size	Vintage	Strategy	Geography	Status
CIRTech Venture Fund	USD 160 M	2016	Investing in innovative Israeli venture firms	Israel, Russia, China	Investment period
Rusnano Sistema Sicar	USD 100 M	2016	Investing in venture and growing projects in microelectronics, clean tech, energy efficiency and robotics	Global focus with localization in Russia	Investment period
Rusnano SINTEZ	RUR 21 BN	2018	Investing in venture and growing projects in chemistry and petrol-chemistry	Russia	Investment period
Wind Energy Development; Investment Fund	RUR 30 BN	2017	Investing in wind energy and other renewable energy projects	Russia	Investment period
First Ecological Fund	RUR 21 BN	2017	Investing in construction and modernization of thermal neutralization and processing companies for municipal waste	Russia	Investment period
Far Eastern High; Technologies Fund	RUR 10 BN	2018	Hi-tech investments in Far East	Russia	Investment period
Russian-Chinese; Growth fund	USD 25 M	2016	Investing in growing projects in nanotechnology-based materials	Global focus with localization in Russia	Investment period

Investment Strategy RUSNANO Management Company invests in projects in Russia and abroad with subsequent expansion to Russia (technology transfer to Russia/creation of manufacturing site and/or R&D center) or Russian technology transfer to foreign companies. RUSNANO Management Company acquires equity in innovative ventures and growth-oriented companies with scalable business models.

The following hi-tech fields are of primary interest to RUSNANO Management Company:

- New Materials (Nanomaterials)
- Nanoelectronics and Photonics
- Biotechnology and Pharmaceuticals
- Coatings and Surface Modification
- Renewable Energy and Energy Efficiency
- Nuclear Medicine and Medical Devices/Instrumentation

Notable Portfolio Companies

New Materials:

- Monocrystal PLC is the leader in the world market of synthetic sapphires used in light emitting diodes, smartphones, tablet PCs and smart watches, for glasses of cameras, sensors of fingerprints as well as displays.

Renewable Energy:

- RUSNANO, together with the Finnish public power company Fortum on a matching funds basis, created the Wind Energy Development Fund (WEDF), with a legal status of an investment partnership, and capital of $520 million. Ninety percent of Fund's investments are aimed at construction of wind parks in Russia and in projects for localizing production of wind power equipment.
- Hevel Solar is one of RUSNANO's portfolio companies in renewable energy sector. In 2009, RUSNANO invested nearly $400 million in the company. Now Hevel markets itself as Russian largest integrated solar energy company. Its key activities are focused on manufacturing of solar modules, construction, and operation of solar power plants and research in the field of solar energy.

Nanostructured Coatings:

- Novomet Group is recognized as a leader in production of oil-submersible equipment, which is highly reliable and is intended for use in challenging conditions. Novomet's pumps owe their competitive advantage to their nanocoating—the result of the use of powder metallurgy technology.

Healthcare:

- The national network of nuclear medicine, PET-Technology, founded 11 operational diagnostic PET/CT centers in the regions of central Russia. PET-Technology network has a 50% share of the Russian PET/CT diagnostic market and is a leader in providing diagnostic services among private players.

Team

RUSNANO Management Company has solid expertise in growth and venture capital investments. Anatoly Chubais is the CEO of RUSNANO Management Company.

In early 2019 Russian government extended the power of RUSNANO Management Company to manage the assets of RUSNANO JSC for a new 10-year term.

Offices

RUSNANO headquarters is located in Moscow (Russia), with additional US and Israeli sub-offices.

=== RUSNANO JSC ===
RUSNANO JSC is the major backbone of RUSNANO Group, is part of Russian system of developmental institutions (institutional innovation pipeline). The company was established in 2011 during reorganization of Russian Corporation of Nanotechnology. RUSNANO JSC main objective is to becoming a global Russian technology investor specializing in investment in competitive Russian and foreign companies implementing promising nanotechnology-based innovations in various fields.

Development role

By late 2018, over 100 portfolio companies including 97 high-tech enterprises have been put into action in the real sector of Russian economy, leading to creation of approximately 39 000 jobs in various high-tech fields. Moreover, RUSNANO's portfolio companies have contributed 132 billion rubles to Russian budget. These payments have already exceeded initial investments made by the Russian government to create the RUSNANO Group.

RUSNANO portfolio companies invested 42,5 billion rubles into R&D. Over the years, around 6000 inventions, prototypes, IPs and trademarks were created by RUSNANO-funded companies.

Financial results

Based on the consolidated financial statements of RUSNANO, based on International Financial Reporting Standards (IFRS) in 2018, the company generated a record net profit of 5,6 billion rubles which was achieved due to an increase of 14,9 billion rubles in the fair value of the investment portfolio, almost two times greater than in 2017.

RUSNANO's total assets by the end of 2018 amounted to 185,5 billion rubles, which represents 17,1 billion rubles increase compared to 2017.

Governing Bodies

JSC RUSNANO is governed by the Board of Directors appointed by Russian Government. JSC RUSNANO's Board of Directors appoints Science and Technology Council carrying out preliminary assessment of projects and providing recommendations on their financing by RUSNANO, and reviewing reports on supported portfolio projects. RUSNANO's Strategic Committee is also appointed by the Board of Directors. RUSNANO Management Company is managing all JSC RUSNANO's assets.

=== Fund for Infrastructure and Educational Programs ===
Fund for Infrastructure and Educational Programs (FIEP) is a non-profit arm of RUSNANO Group managing various projects targeting creation of innovative nanotechnology-related ecosystem in Russia. FIEP is governed by a Supervisory Board, the supreme collegial body determining strategical goals and budgeting and the Executive Board responsible for program management and daily activities of the Fund. FIEP is operating in the number of important areas, such as education, R&D, infrastructure and promotional activities.

FIEP organizes the international RUSNANOPRIZE award. Established in 2009, it is awarded annually for the best nanotechnology developments implemented in mass production in one of four directions: “Nanomaterials and Surface Modification”, “Medicine, Pharmacology and Biotechnology”, “Optics and Electronics”, “Energy Efficiency and Green Technologies”.
