= Nikolai Nikonov =

Russian architect (1849-1918)

Nikolai Nikitich Nikonov
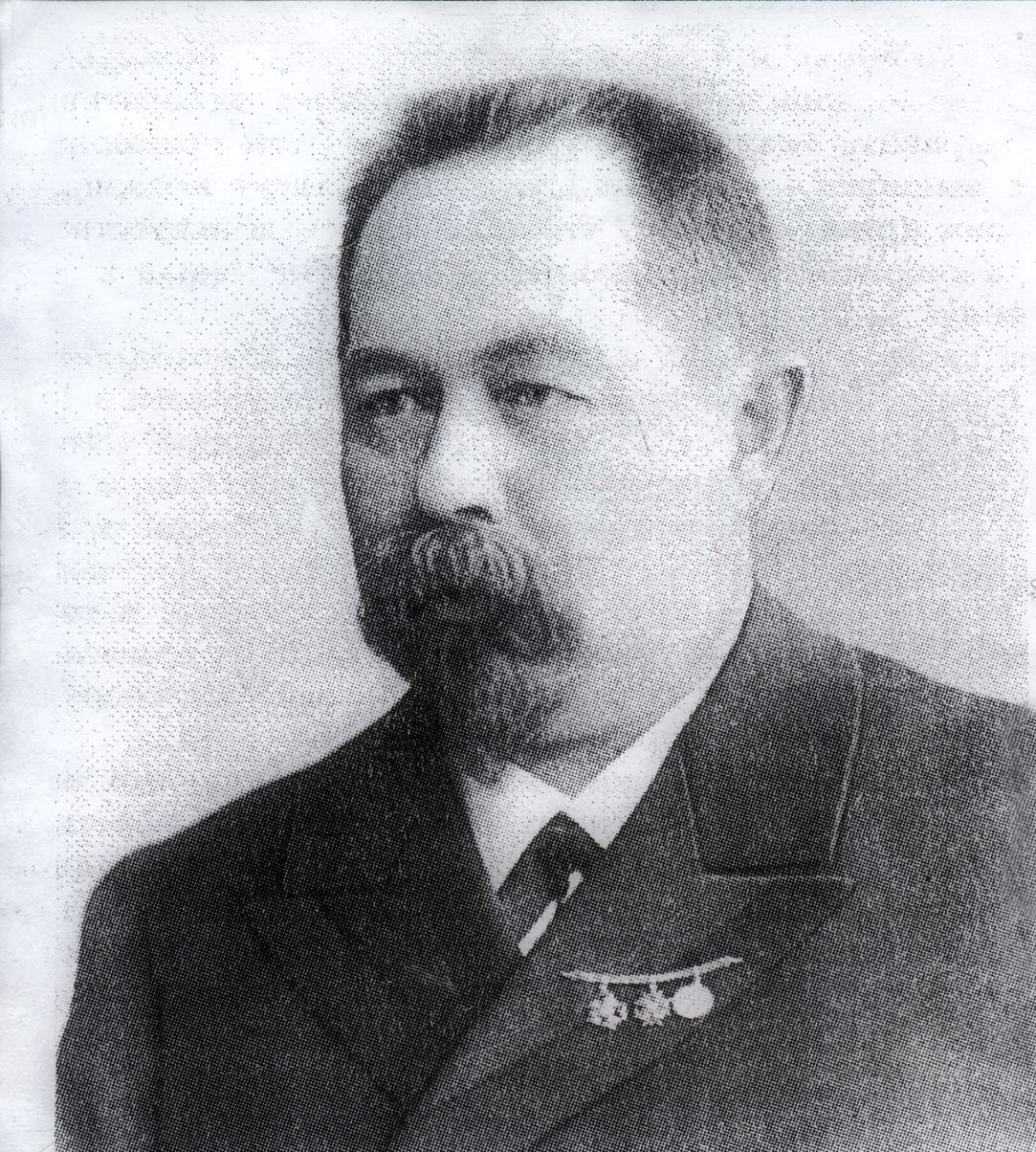
- Born: April 8, 1849; Anufrievo, Poshekhonsky Uyezd, Yaroslavl Governorate, Russian Empire
- Died: 1918 (aged 68–69); Samara, Russian Soviet Federative Socialist Republic
- Occupation: Architect
- Awards: Order of Saint Stanislaus

Nikolai Nikitich Nikonov (1849–1918) was a Russian architect in Saint Petersburg in the late 19th and early 20th centuries. Nikonov was a master of Russian revival architecture. Many of his projects were churches.

== Early life ==
Nikonov was born in 1849 into a serf family in Anufrievo, Poshekhonsky Uyezd, Yaroslavl Governorate in the Russian Empire. He was admitted to the Imperial Academy of Arts in 1872 but was expelled in 1881 for poor attendance.

== Career ==
Alexander III of Russia appointed Nikonov as a collegiate registrar on March 10, 1890. Nikonov became an architect in Saint Petersburg, Russia, in the late 19th and early 20th centuries. He was a leading proponent and master of the Russian Revival architecture. One of his early projects was a house for N. P. Basin at 5 Ostrovsky Square in 1878. He also designed Bolshoy Avenue 45 in 1900. Another project was the Nikonov Apartment House in on Kolokoknaya Ulitsa 11 in Saint Petersburg, which he owned and designed in the Russian Revival style. Built between 1899 and 1900, the five-story aprtment building is also called the "Gingerbread House".

In 1899, he renovated and expanded the Zimin's house on Kolokolnaya Ulitsa in Saint Petersburg, turning a two-story house into a five-story house and decorating the exterior with majolica tiles made at the Nikolay Gogol School of Technical Art in Ukraine. This building is now "almost an encyclopedia of traditional Russian architecture".

Nikonov designed many notable churches in Moscow, New Athos, Poltava, Saint Petersburg, Tallinn, and Valaam. An early project was the Church of the Annunciation, located at 5th Sovetskaya and Degtyarnaya Streets in Saint Petersburg, built between 1889 and 1893 in Russian revival style.. He designed the Church of the Intercession at Borovaya Street in 1890. He also designed the Church of St. John the Theologian in the Leushinsky Monastery of St. John the Baptist in Saint Petersburg in 1894. His later projects included the Ioannovsky Convent in 1902 and the Church of Our Lady of Kazan in Zelenogorsk, Saint Petersburg in 1910. His best known work in Saint Petersburg is the Convent of St. John of Rila, situated on the Petrograd side of on the Karpovka River emankment. He also designed the Church of the Holy Trinity, located at the corner of Ulitsa Marata and Stremyannaya Ulitsa in Saint Petersburg; however, the church was demolished in 1964 as part of the construction of Moskovskaya metro station.

== Awards ==
On May 14, 1896, Nikonov received the Order of Saint Stanislaus, 3rd Class.

== Personal life ==
Nikonov lived at 11 Kolokolnaya Street in Saint Petersburg between 1900 and 1905.

Nikonov died in Samara, Russia, in 1918.

== Selected projects ==
- House of N. P. Basin, 5 Ostrovsky Square. 1878
- Church of St. Nicholas, Kotly, Kingiseppsky District, Leningrad Oblast. 1882
- Church of the Resurrection of Christ, Lukhsky District, Leningrad Oblast. 1887
- Church of the Intercession, Borovaya Street. 1890
- Cathedral of St. Peter and Paul, Petergof, Leningrad Oblast. 1890, with Ivan Ivanovich Shaposhnikov
- Holy Trinity Church, St. Petersburg. 1890–1893
- Church of the Nativity of the Blessed Virgin Mary, Penino, Slantsevsky District, Leningrad. 1893–1900
- Church of St. John the Theologian in the Leushinsky Monastery of St. John the Baptist, St. Petersburg. 1894
- Rebuild of St. Sampson's Church, Poltava. 1895
- Church of St. Mary in the Bolsheokhtinskoye Cemetery. 1895–1898; demolished in 1929
- Church of the Assumption of the Blessed Virgin Mary, Slantsevsky District, Leningrad Oblast. 1896–1899
- Church of St. Nicholas, Lavrovo. 1898–1902
- Kolokolnaya Street, 11. 1899
- Zimin's house, Kolokolnaya Ulitsa, Saint Petersburg, expansion, 1899
- Alexander-Mariinsky Almshouse, 1899
- Nikonov Apartment House (aka the Gingerbread House), Kolokoknaya Ulitsa 11, Saint Petersburg. 1899–1900
- Church of Our Lady of Kazan, Zelenogorsk. 1910
- Bolshoy Avenue, 45. 1900–1901
- Ioannovsky Convent. 1902
- Church of the Descent of the Holy Spirit on the Apostles (Svyatodukhovskaya Church), Komarovo, Saint Petersburg.1905–1906; burned in 1917 and rebuilt in 2011.
- Church of the Tikhvin Icon of the Mother of God of the Holy Trinity, Lyutikovo Monastery. 1905–1913; closed in 1934 and demolished in 1982
- Convent of St. John of Rila on the Karpovka River Emankment on the Petrograd Side, Saint Petersburg
- Church of the Holy Trinity, corner of Ulitsa Marata and Stremyannaya Ulitsa in Saint Petersburg; demolished in 1964
- Church of the Annunciation, 5th Sovetskaya and Degtyarnaya Streets, Saint Petersburg. 1889–1893.
