= Terijoki Yacht Club =

Terijoki Yacht Club (TYC)
- Terijoki Yacht Club burgee
- Nickname: Central River Yacht Club
- Formation: 1860
- Legal status: Active
- Purpose: Advocate and public voice, educator and network for recreational boating, and competitive sailors, coaches, volunteers and events
- Location: #1 Gavannaja street, Zelenogorsk, Saint Petersburg, Russia
- Official language: English, Russian

Terijoki Yacht club is located in Zelenogorsk, Russia, in # 1 Gavannaja street.

There was a scandal in connection with 60 fire safety infractions leading to the temporary closing of the club for 30 days in 2009. Since then, the club has remained open.
