= Anufrievo =

Anufrievo Ануфриево
- Village
- Interactive map of Anufrievo
- Country: Russia
- Oblast: Yaroslavl Oblast
- District: Poshekhonsky District
- Municipality: Prigorodnoye Rural Settlement

Population (2010)
  - Total: 0
- Time zone: UTC+3
- Postal code: 152890

Anufrievo Russian: Ануфриево is a depopulated village in the Poshekhonsky District of the Yaroslavl Oblast in Russia.

Russian Architect, Nikolai Nikonov was born in the village in 1849.

== Geography ==
The village is located in the Northern area of Yaroslavl Oblast on the bank of the Nosa River. The village is 37 kilometres Northeast of Poshekhonye.

The village is in the Moscow Time zone (UTC+3).

== Population ==
The village had a population of 2 in 2007, and 0 in 2010.
