= Lev Isaakovich Bakhman =

Russian architect (1830–1896)

- Born: 1830; Kishinev, Bessarabia
- Died: 1896 (aged 65–66); Petergof, Russian Empire
- Education: Imperial Academy of Arts
- Occupation: Architect
- Buildings: Grand Choral Synagogue

Lev Isaakovich Bakhman (1830–1896) was a Russian architect of the Eclectic Movement.

Bakhman attended the Imperial Academy of Arts in Saint Petersburg, and was the first Jew to graduate there.

He designed the monument to Alexander Pushkin in Moscow in 1860 and the Grand Choral Synagogue in 1880 in Moorish Style along with Ivan Ivanovich Shaposhnikov.
