= Grand Choral Synagogue (Saint Petersburg) =

Synagogue in Saint Petersburg, Russia

- Russian: Санкт-Петербургская Большая Хоральная Синагога
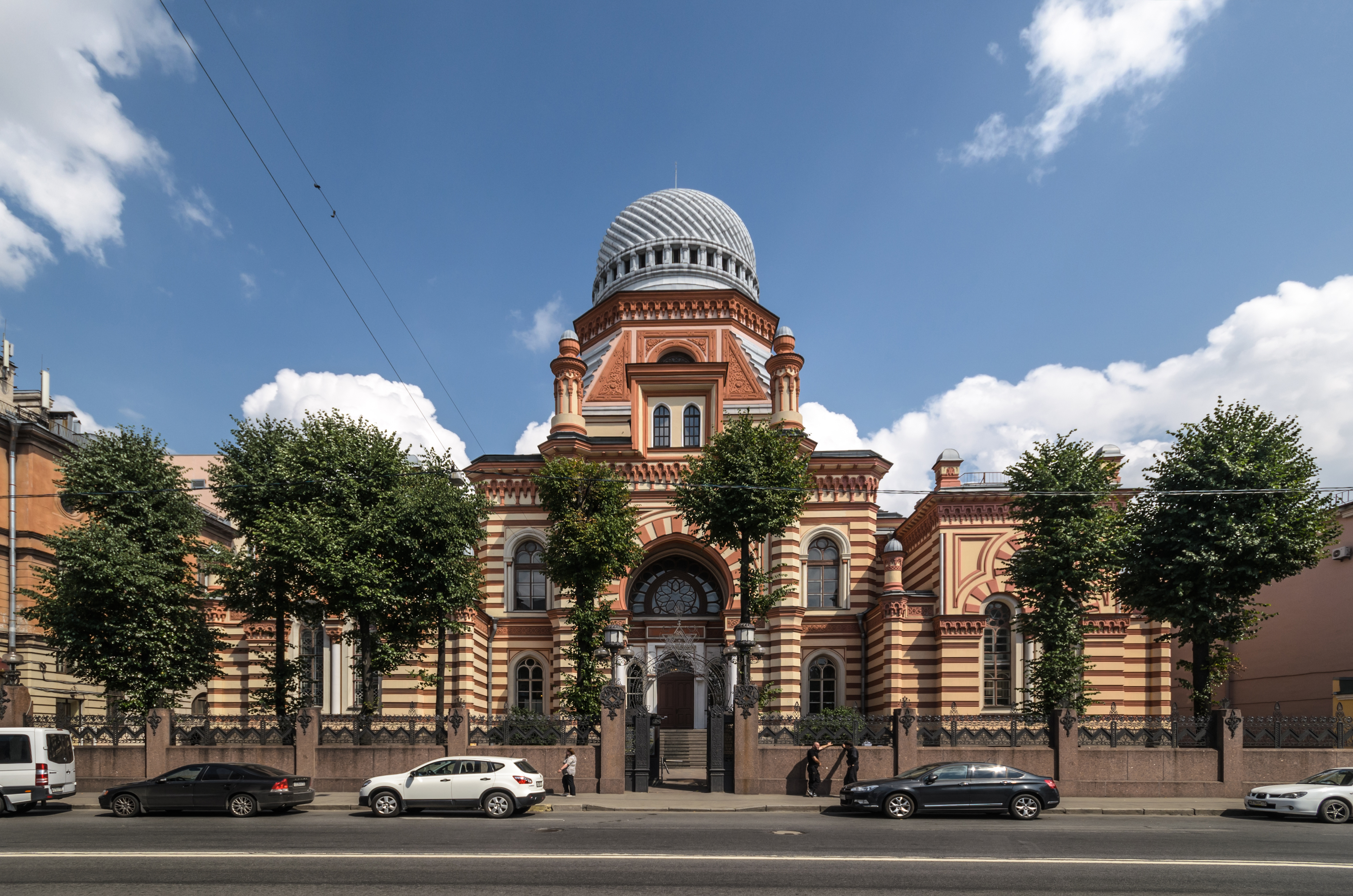
- The synagogue, in 2014

- Location of the synagogue in Saint Petersburg

Religion
- Affiliation: Orthodox Judaism
- Ecclesiastical or organisational status: Synagogue
- Leadership: Menachem Mendel Pewzner
- Year consecrated: 1893
- Status: Active

Location
- Location: 2 Lermontovskii Avenue, Saint Petersburg
- Country: Russia
- Coordinates: 59°55′30″N 30°17′31.2″E

Architecture
- Architects: Lev Isaakovich Bakhman; Ivan Ivanovich Shaposhnikov; Aleksei Malov
- Type: Synagogue architecture
- Style: Eclecticism; Moorish Revival; Byzantine Revival
- Established: 1869 (as a congregation)
- Groundbreaking: 1880
- Completed: 1888

Specifications
- Height (max): 47 m (154 ft)
- Dome: One
- Materials: Brick

Website
- en.jeps.ru

The Grand Choral Synagogue of Saint Petersburg (Russian: Санкт-Петербургская Большая Хоральная Синагога, romanized: Sankt-Peterburgskaya Bolshaya Khoralnaya Sinagoga; Hebrew: בית הכנסת הכוראלי הגדול (סנקט פטרבורג)) is an Orthodox Jewish congregation and synagogue, located at 2 Lermontovskii Avenue, in Saint Petersburg, Russia. The synagogue, the third-largest in Europe, is also known as the Great Choral Synagogue of Saint Petersburg and, since 2000, the Edmond J. Safra Grand Choral Synagogue, in honor of the late philanthropist, Edmond Safra. Sometimes it is simply referred to as the Grand Synagogue (Russian: Большая Синагога, romanized: Bolshaya Sinagoga).

The synagogue was designed by architects Lev Isaakovich Bakhman, Ivan Ivanovich Shaposhnikov, and Aleksei Malov in an eclectic mix of the Moorish Revival and Byzantine Revival styles, completed in 1888, and consecrated in December 1893. The Chief Rabbi of Saint Petersburg is Menachem Mendel Pewzner. The synagogue is a registered landmark and an architectural monument of federal importance, listed on the Russian cultural heritage register since 2001.

== History ==
=== Permit from the emperor ===
By 1870, there were about ten Jewish houses of worship in Saint Petersburg; however, there was no synagogue in which the Jewish community as a whole could meet in what was then the capital of the Russian Empire.

The construction of the Grand Synagogue was made possible after Tsar Alexander II granted permission on 1 September 1869 in response to a request from the wealthy Russian Jewish philanthropist Joseph Günzburg (Evzel' Gavriilovich Gintsburg) and the first chairman of the St. Petersburg Jewish Community, entrepreneur and railroad developer Samuel Polyakov. Joseph's son Horace was chairman of the Saint Petersburg Jewish Community in 1869–1909 and supervised the construction of the synagogue.

The plot of land for the synagogue was bought in 1879 for 65,000 rubles. The construction of the synagogue was subject to multiple conditions and restrictions. For example, the synagogue could not be sited near Christian churches, nor near government roads used by the tsars. Another restriction was the height of the building, which was limited to 47 m (154 ft), instead of the 65 m (213 ft) proposed by the architects. In fact, no building in Saint Petersburg could be higher than 23 m (75 ft), the height of the tsar's Winter Palace, and exemptions were only given for bell towers and domes, because they also served as observation towers for fire watch and other safety purposes. While allowing the synagogue to be 47 m (154 ft) tall, the tsar imposed several other requirements in his edict, which reads in part: "His Majesty, noting that a more modest appearance befits the building of the first synagogue in the capital, according to the civic standing of Jews in our homeland, gives the Tsar's permission for building the synagogue."

=== Architecture ===
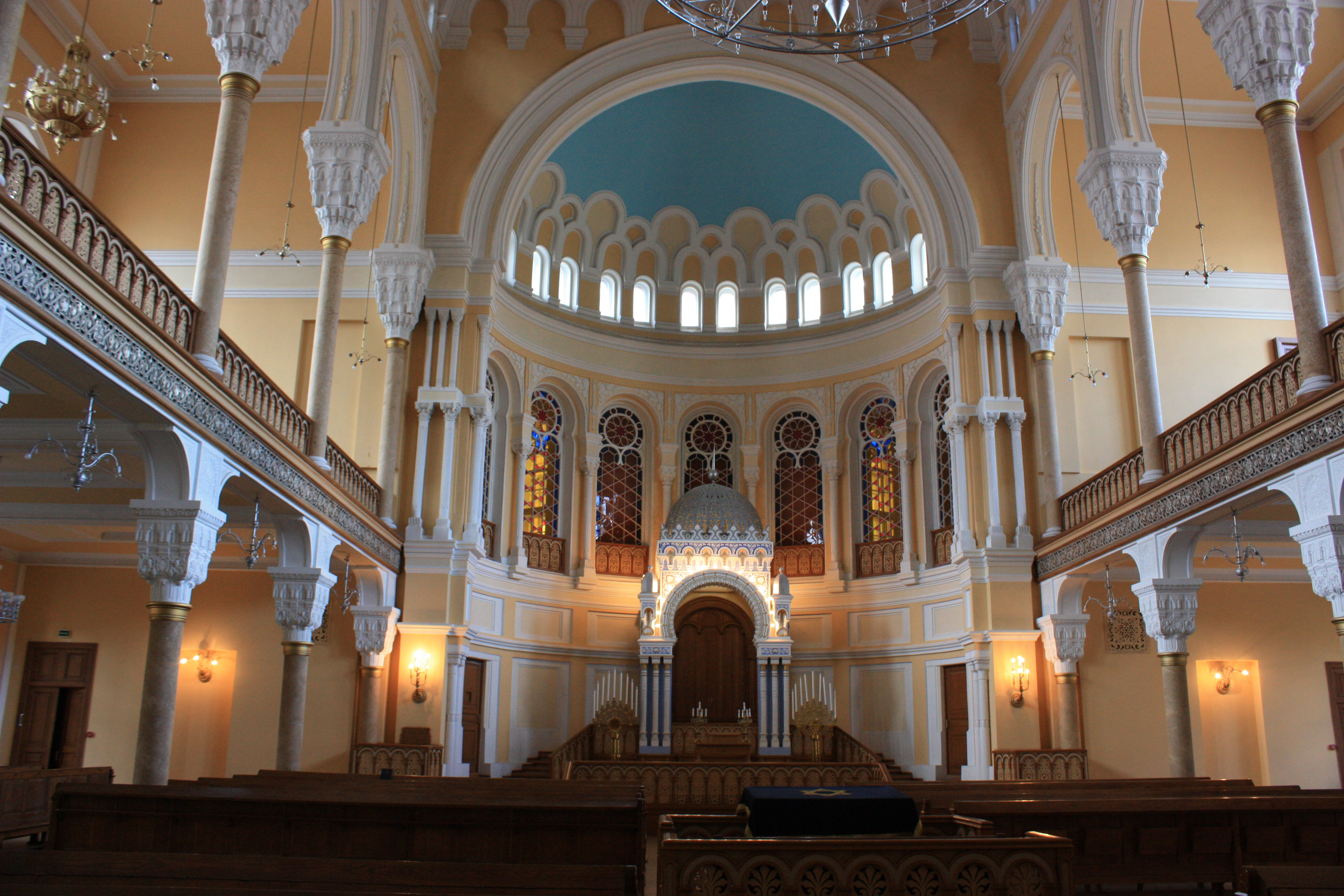
Main Hall ("Bolshoi Zal") of the Grand Choral Synagogue of Saint Petersburg

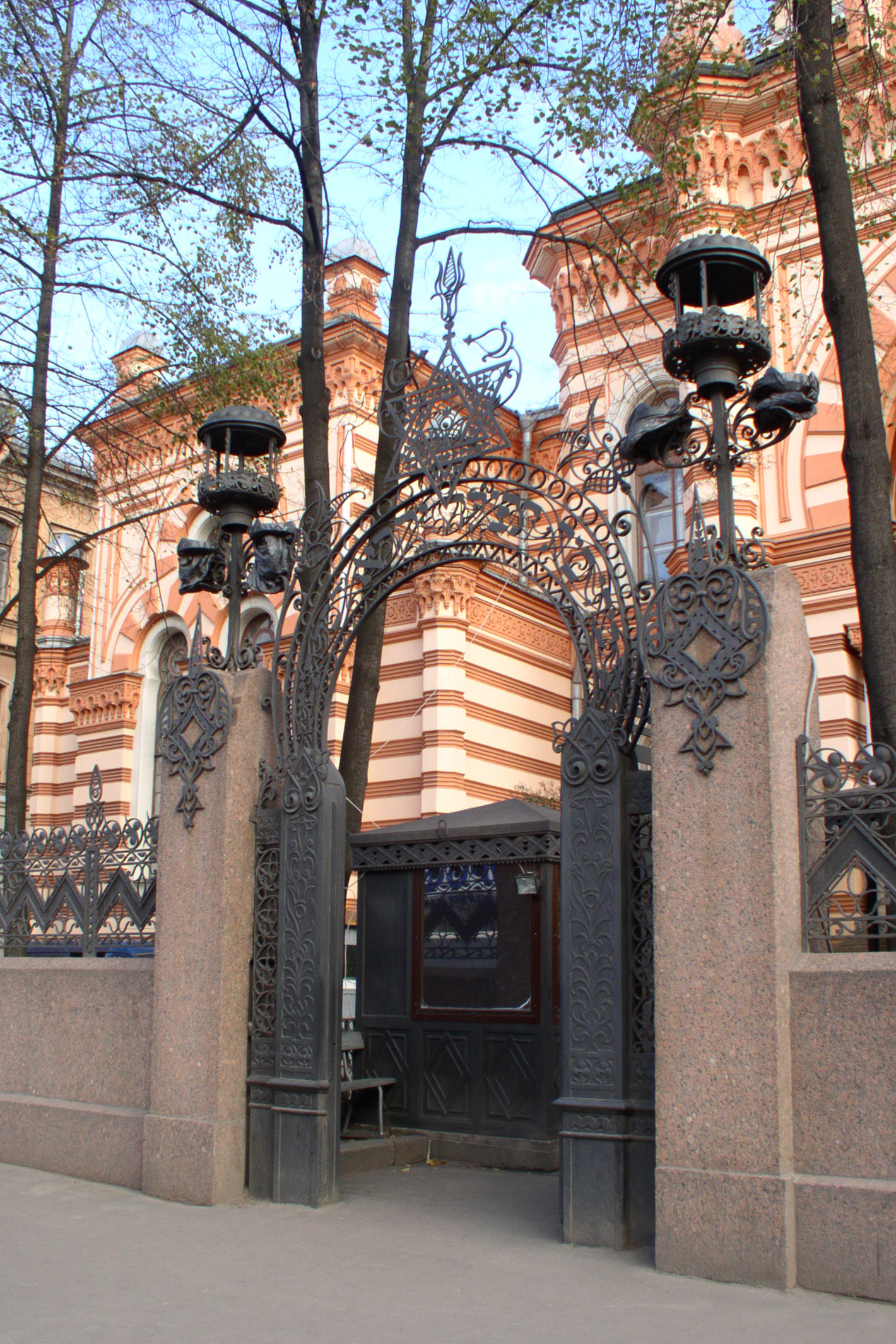
Main gate of synagogue

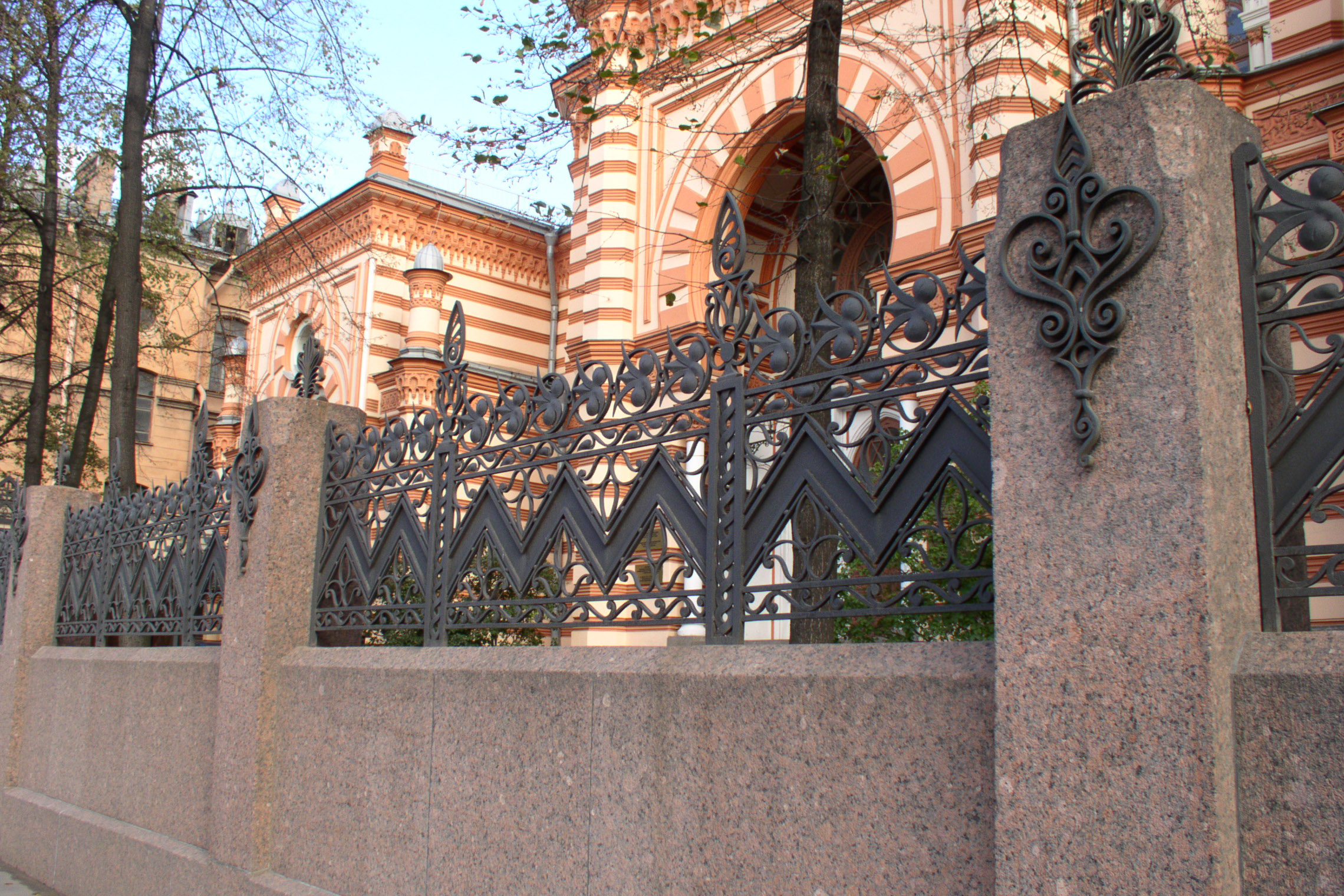
Synagogue fence

The architects and supervisors for the first synagogue in Saint Petersburg chose the Moorish Revival style for its design, modeled in part after Berlin's Oranienburger Straße New Synagogue with its melange of Moorish and Byzantine motifs. In the end, the project boasted an eclectic blend of Byzantine Revival and Moorish Revival styles with Arabesque motifs, upon the request of V. V. Stasov, the influential Russian art critic and supervisor of the project. The Great Choral Synagogue was designed by architects Ivan Ivanovich Shaposhnikov, Lev Isaakovich Bakhman, and V. A. Shreter, with the participation of V. V. Stasov and N. L. Benois, who was the curator of the project and the confidant of the tsar and the Russian government. Poet Osip Mandelstam later called the building a "lush strangler fig tree."

The land for the synagogue was allocated near the Mariinsky Theatre. The construction was carried out under the management of the Construction Committee headed by A. A. Kaufman. The architect and superintendent of construction was A.V. Malov, between 1880 and 1888, and his assistants were S. O. Klein and B. I. Girshovich. The Small Synagogue was opened first, in 1886. The Great Choral Synagogue was consecrated in 1893.

=== During the First World War ===
A 100-bed hospital for the wounded of all religions was organised by the Jewish community of Saint Petersburg on the premises of the synagogue. The yeshiva building near the synagogue also served as a medical facility for many years.

=== In the Soviet era ===
After the 1917 revolution and the subsequent Russian Civil War, the Jewish community of Saint Petersburg lost many members to emigration. The Soviet authorities imposed a restriction on bank accounts related to the synagogue and dissolved the Saint Petersburg Jewish Community, in a decree signed by Grigory Zinoviev.

=== During the Second World War ===
The Saint Petersburg Synagogue was bombed by the Nazis during the Siege of Leningrad between 1941 and 1943. However, the hospital on the premises of the synagogue remained in operation. The Jewish community managed to survive the siege of Leningrad, as well as other oppression over the years.

=== National landmark ===
Today the Great Choral Synagogue of Saint Petersburg is a registered landmark and an architectural monument of federal importance. Major reconstruction was carried out between 2000 and 2003. On 26 June 2001, the Great Hall was reopened after reconstruction. The Great Hall, also called the Main Hall, holds 1,200 worshipers and has women's galleries on three sides.

=== Reconstruction and renaming ===
After a US$5 million donation by the Safra family in 1999, the synagogue was reconstructed between 2000 and 2005. In honor of the philanthropic support, the synagogue was renamed The Edmond J. Safra Grand Choral Synagogue, although it is more commonly known in Russian as Bolshaya Sinagoga or the "Grand Synagogue".

In 2005 a new mikvah was built from a design by Israeli architect M. Gorelik. The new mikvah was inaugurated on 19 April 2005.

=== Antisemitic attacks ===
On 5 May 2012, a swastika was spray-painted on the synagogue's fence.

== Gallery ==
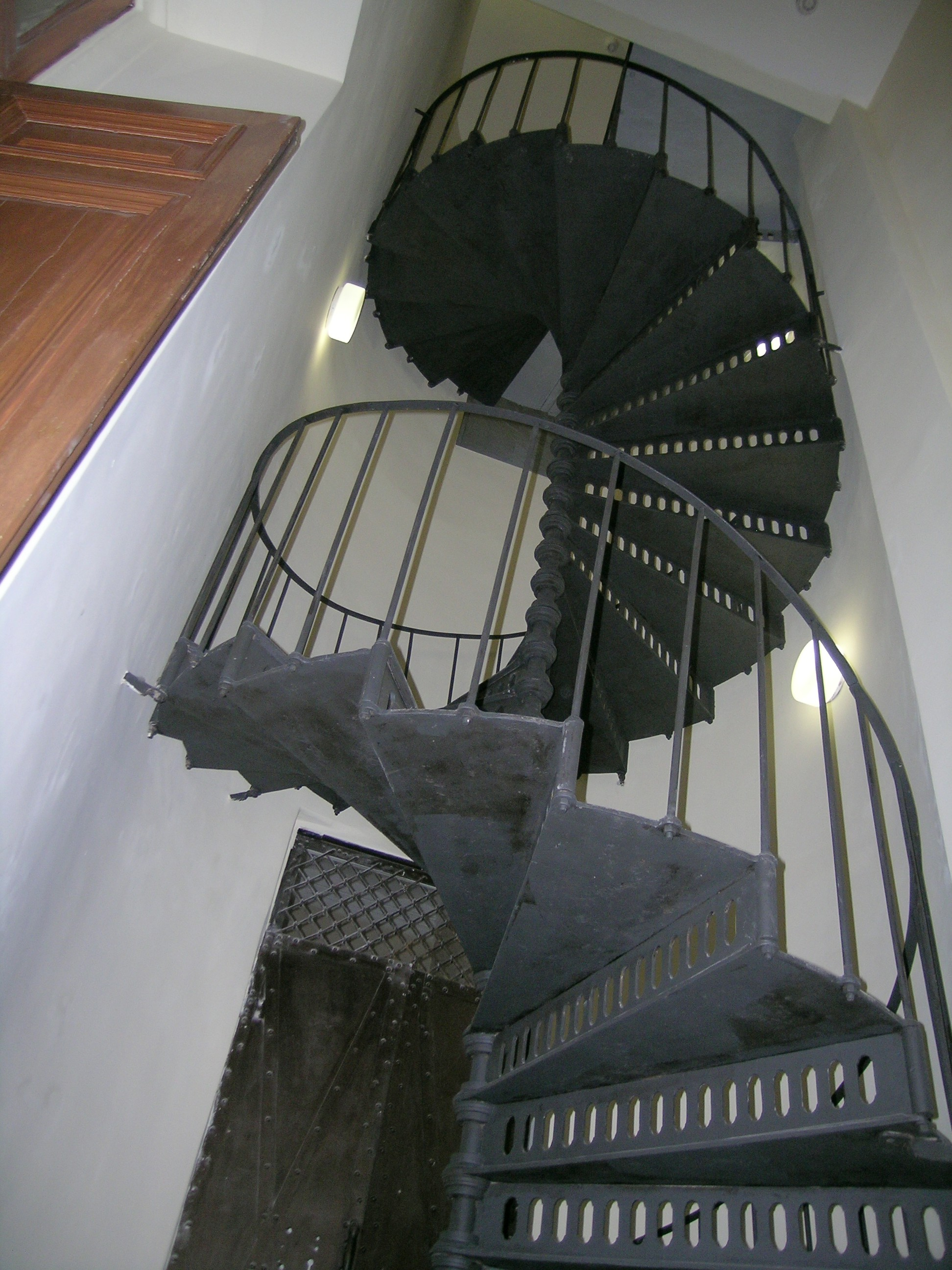
Spiral staircase

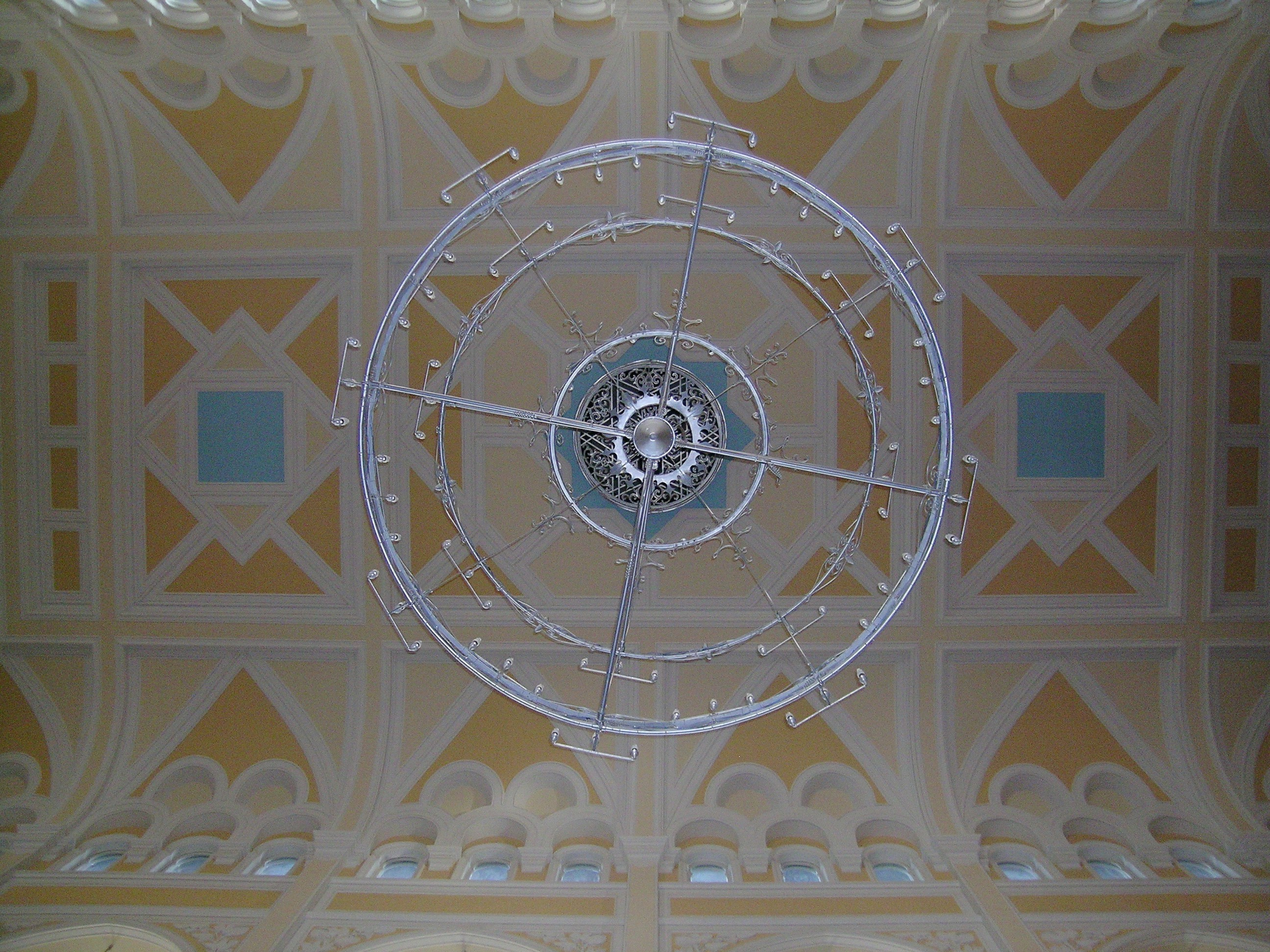
Dome interior, close up

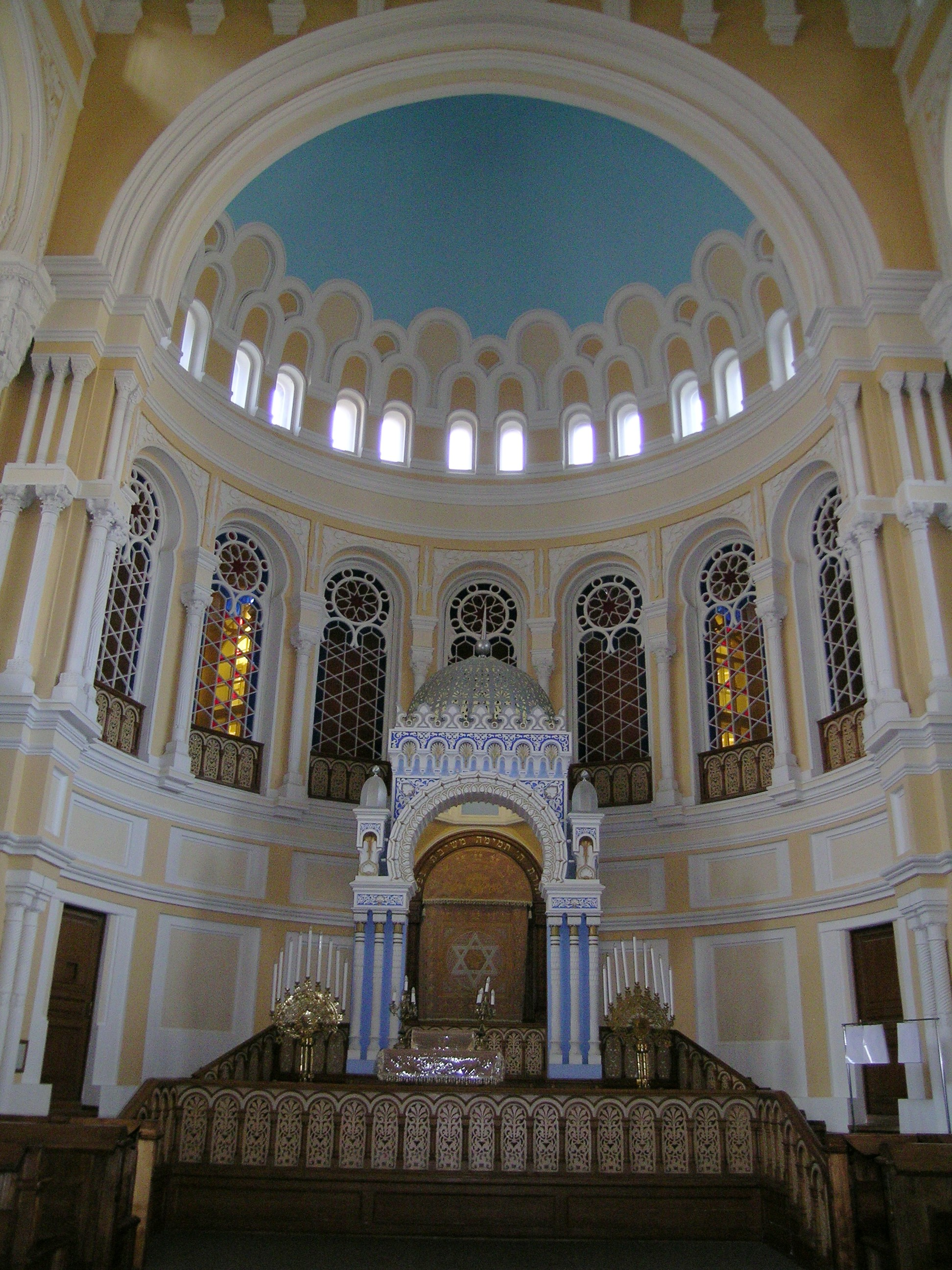
Dome interior

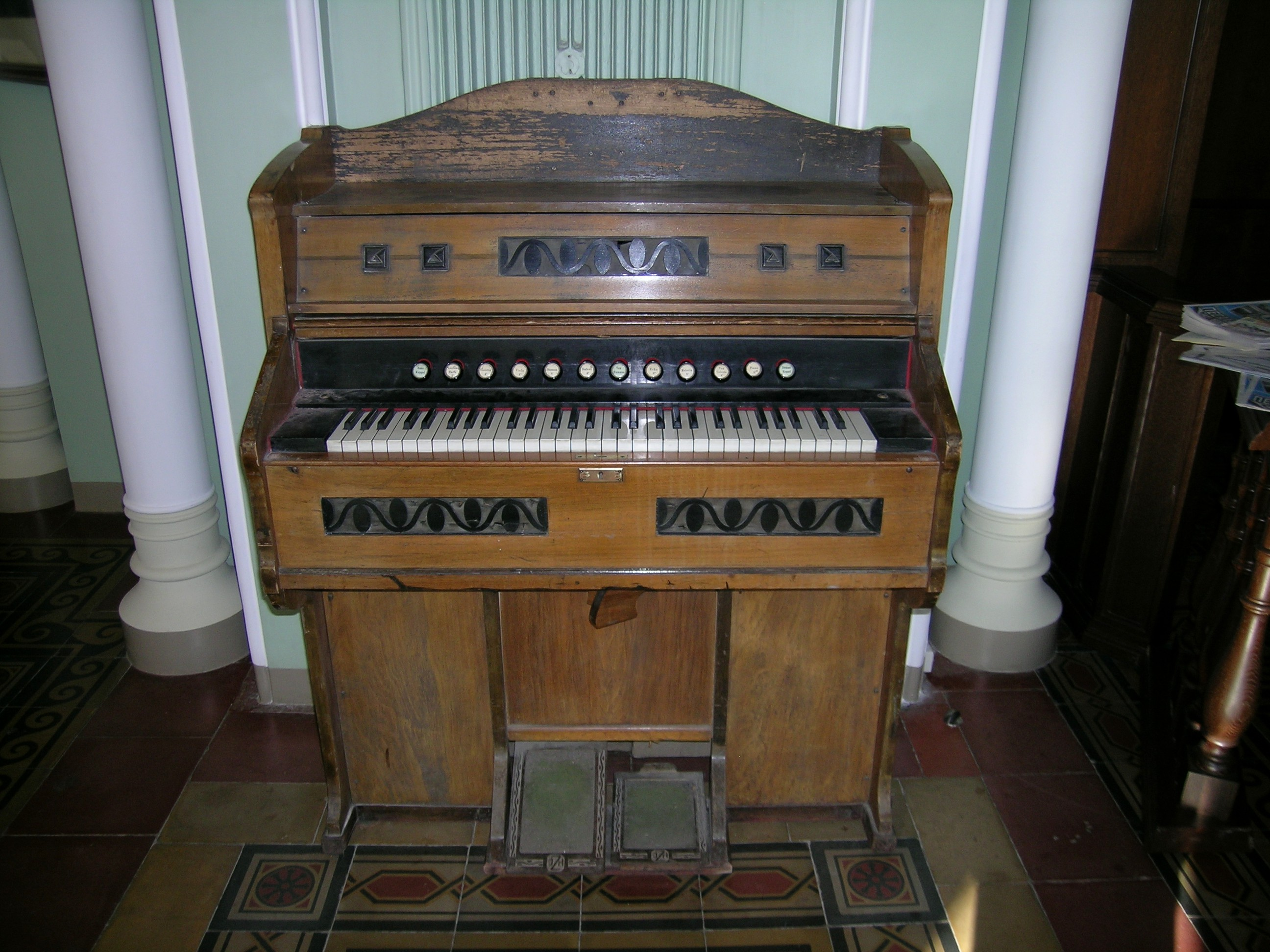
Organ

== See also ==
- History of the Jews in Russia
- List of synagogues in Russia
