= Ivan Ivanovich Shaposhnikov =

Russian architect (1883–1898)

- Born: 2 June 1833
- Died: 31 March 1898 (aged 64)
- Education: Imperial Academy of Arts
- Occupation: Architect
- Practice: Technical Committee of the Engineering Department of the Ministry of War
- Buildings: Grand Choral Synagogue

Ivan Ivanovich Shaposhnikov 2 June 1833 – 31 March 1898) was a Russian architect and Academician of Architecture. He was the father of Theosophist Helena Roerich.

== Biography ==
The grandfather of Shaposhnikov first came to Russia from Riga during the reign of Peter the Great, where he was a Bürgermeister.

Ivan Shaposhnikov studied at the Imperial Commercial College from 1844 to 1847, and the Imperial Academy of Arts from 1855 to 1864. He then became a teacher at the Construction School, and from 1872 at the Technological Institute, and from 1882, he was an architect in the Main Engineering Department in the Ministry of War. He was a founding member of the Saint Petersburg Society of Architects in 1870.

Shaposhnikov rebuilt and restored the Cathedral of St. Peter and Paul in Petergof in 1890 with Nikolai Nikonov. He also designed buildings for the Alexander Steel Plant in Saint Petersburg. He also designed the Grand Choral Synagogue in 1880, along with Lev Isaakovich Bakhman.

== Family ==
Shaposhnikov was married to Ekaterina Golenishcheva-Kutuzova. They had three children, Hilarion, Anna and Helena. He was raised to the status of nobility in 1897, with his wife and daughter.

Ektaterina's family had originated in Novgorod in the Late 13th Century. Members of this family included Mikhail Kutuzov, Arseny Golenishchev-Kutuzov, and Modest Mussorgsky.

== Awards ==
- Order of Saint Stanislaus, 2nd and 3rd class
- Order of Saint Anna, 2nd and 3rd Class
- Order of Saint Vladimir, 3rd and 4th Class

== Buildings ==
- Rimsky-Korsakov Avenue, 55. 1885.
- Tchaikovsky Street, 31. 1873.
- Tchaikovsky Street, 18. 1876–1877.
- Borovaya Street, 23. 1877.
- Rizhsky Avenue, 25. 1880.
- 19th Line Street, 12. 1881.
- Griboyedov Embankment, 138. 1883.
- Grand Choral Synagogue
- Angliyski Avenue, 18. 1887.
- Oskalenko Street, 18. Infirmary of the St. Petersburg Provincial Zemstvo. 1891–1899.
- Pryazhka Embankment, 5. A. Ilyin's Map Factor. 1896–1897.
- Obukhovskoy Oborony Avenue, 116.
- Komsomola Street, 22
