= Church of Our Lady of Kazan (Zelenogorsk) =

- Russian: Церковь Казанской иконы Божьей Матери; Finnish: Terijoen ortodoksinen kirkko
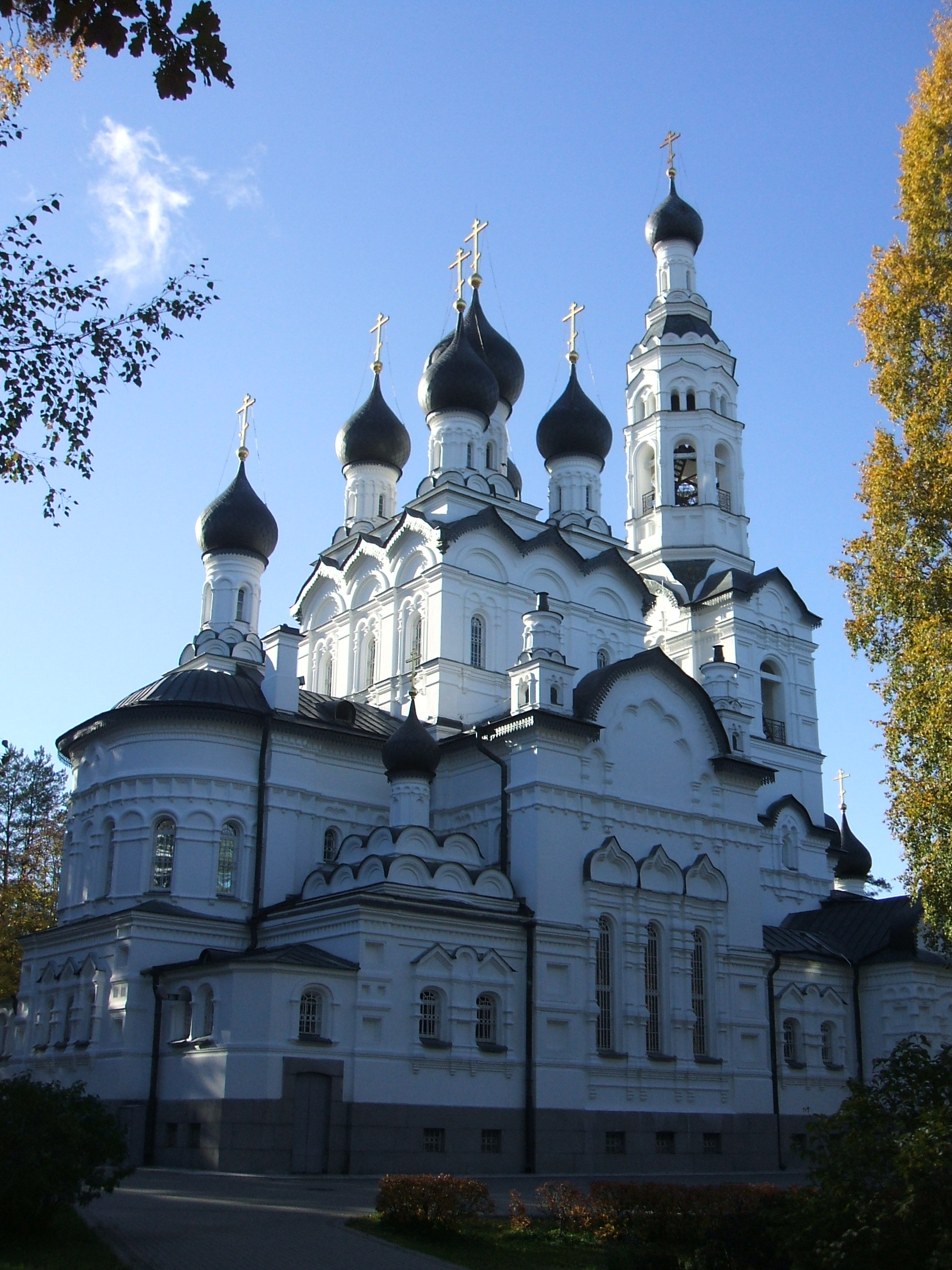
- Church of Our Lady of Kazan
- 60.192311°N 29.70627°E
- Location: Zelenogorsk, Saint Petersburg
- Country: Russia
- Denomination: Russian Orthodox

History
- Consecrated: 1915, destroyed 1939; reconsecrated 1990

Architecture
- Architect: Nikolay Nikonov
- Style: Russian
- Groundbreaking: 1910
- Completed: 1915

Church of Our Lady of Kazan (also Church of the Theotokos of Kazan, Russian: Церковь Казанской иконы Божьей Матери, Finnish: Terijoen ortodoksinen kirkko) is a Russian Orthodox church in Zelenogorsk (Finnish:Terijoki) in Russia. It was completed in 1915 while the town was a part of the Grand Duchy of Finland. The church is dedicated to Our Lady of Kazan, probably the most venerated icon in Russia.

== History ==
Church of Our Lady of Kazan was designed by the architect Nikolay Nikonov and raised for the Russian villa colony in Terijoki. During the Finnish period, it was the largest Eastern Orthodox church in Finland. As Terijoki was captured by the Soviet troops in 1939, the church served as a warehouse until the late 1970s. It was renovated in the 1980s and reconsecrated in 1990 by the Patriarch Alexy II of Moscow.

Church of Our Lady of Kazan was preceded by the Orthodox church in Terijoki, which was completed in 1880 by the design of Fjodor Kharlamov. The Terijoki Church was funded by a wealthy St. Petersburg businessman Andrei Ivanovich Durdin who had a villa in Terijoki. As the population of the villa colony rose up to tens of thousands, the church was enlarged in 1894 by the drawings of J. F. Bruni. It was originally one of the churches of Raivola parish and the Terijoki parish was established in 1898. In December 1907 the wooden church in Terijoki was destroyed in a fire. The new church was raised a 500 metres west to the centers village of Terijoki, next to the 1907 completed Terijoki Lutheran Church.

== Gallery ==
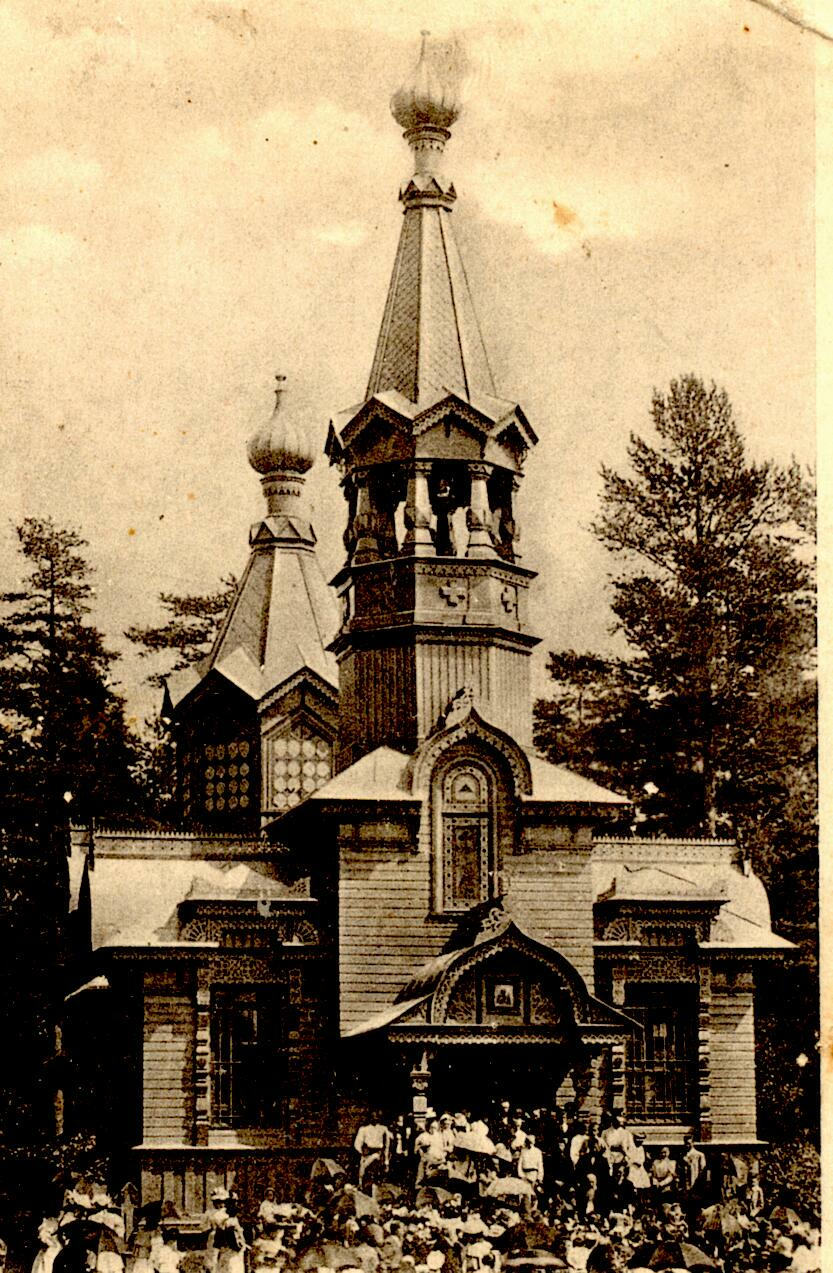
The wooden church in Kuokkala

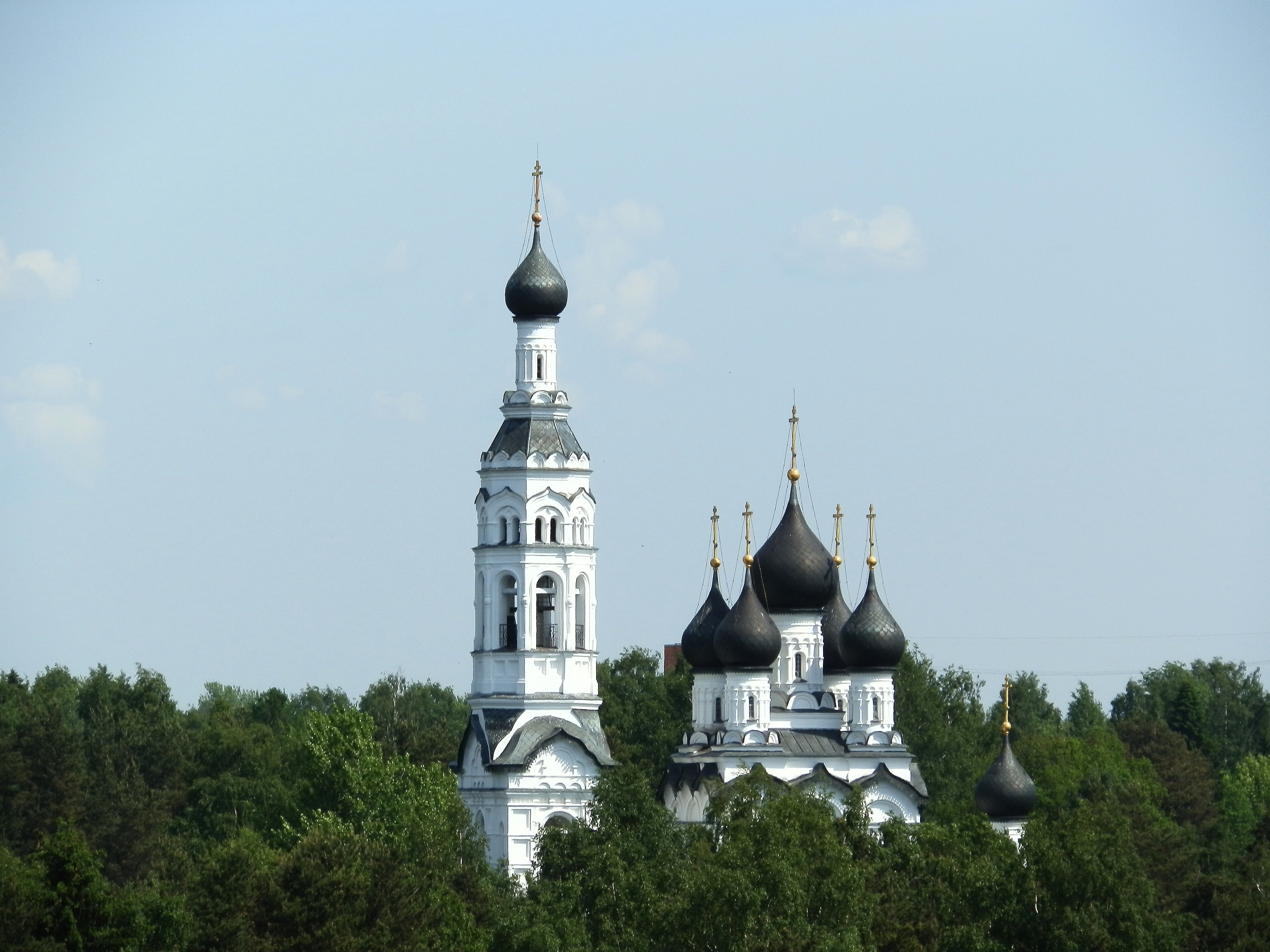
Church of Our Lady of Kazan

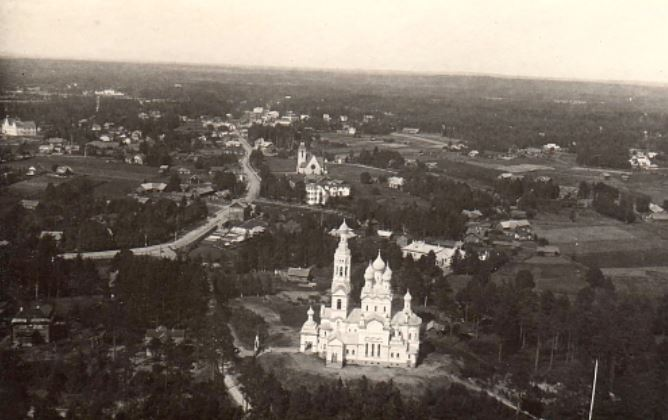
Church of Our Lady of Kazan and the Lutheran Terijoki Church in behind, image from the 1930s
