= Poshekhonsky Uyezd =

Poshekhonsky Uyezd (Пошехонский уезд) was one of the subdivisions of the Yaroslavl Governorate of the Russian Empire. It was situated in the northern part of the governorate. Its administrative centre was Poshekhonye.

== Demographics ==
At the time of the Russian Empire Census of 1897, Poshekhonsky Uyezd had a population of 110,912. Of these, 99.8% spoke Russian and 0.1% Estonian as their native language.
