= Zelenogorsk, Saint Petersburg =

Zelenogorsk Зеленогорск Terijoki (Finnish)
- Municipal town

Other transcription(s)
  - Finnish: Terijoki
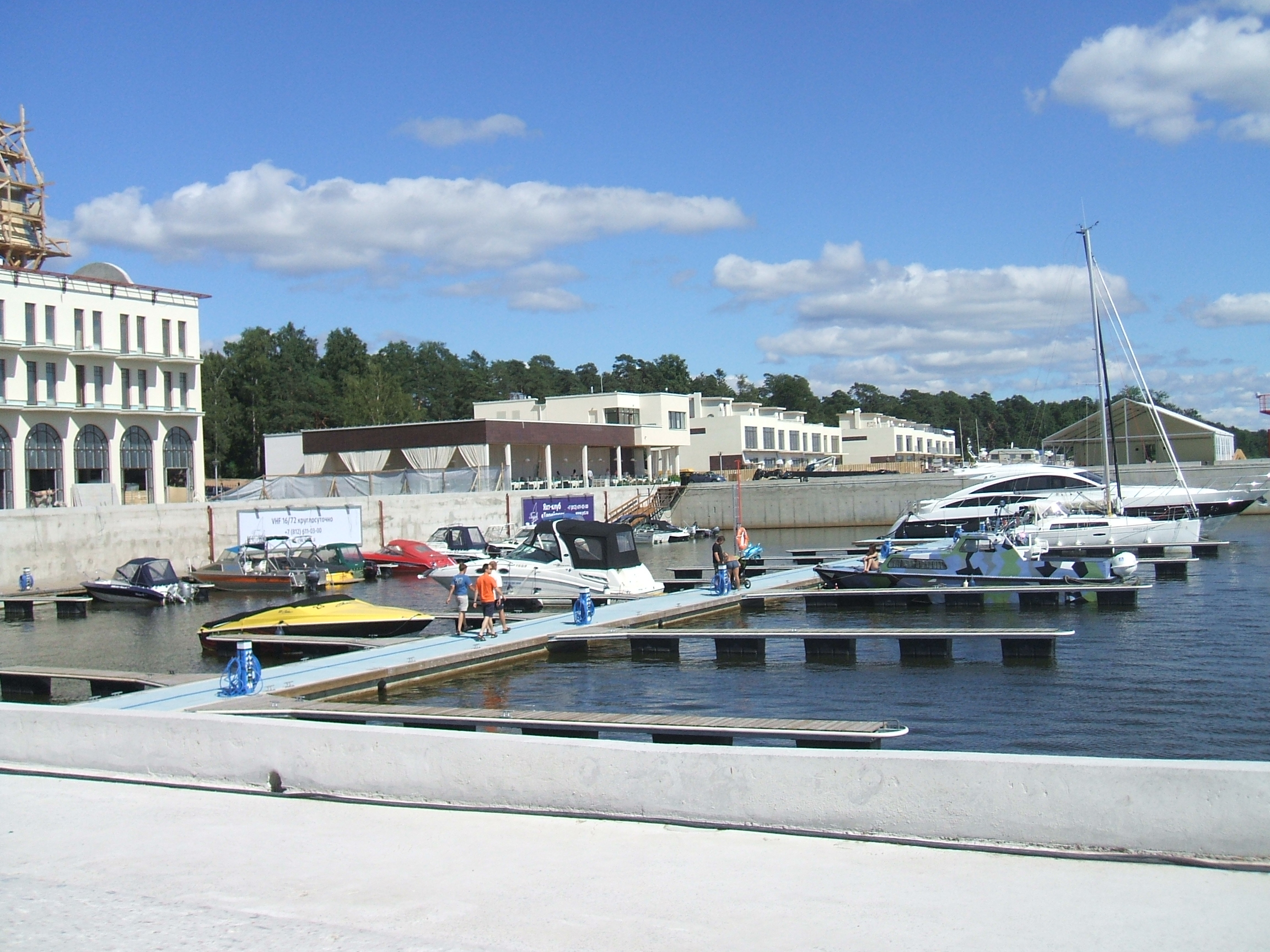

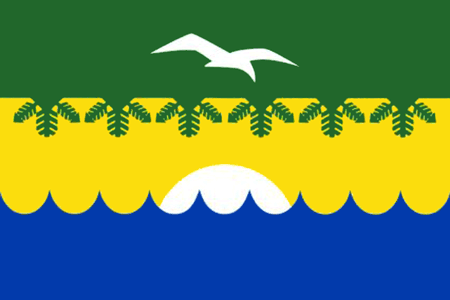
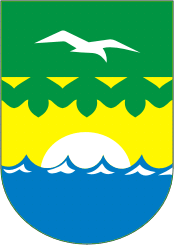
- Flag Coat of arms

- Location of Zelenogorsk in Saint Petersburg
- Interactive map of Zelenogorsk
- Location of Zelenogorsk Zelenogorsk (Saint Petersburg)
- Coordinates: 60°12′N 29°42′E
- Country: Russia
- Federal subject: Saint Petersburg

Population (2010 Census)
  - Total: 14,958
  - Estimate (2023): 15,492 (+3.6%)
- Time zone: UTC+
- Postal code: 197720
- Dialing code: +7 812 (as in the rest of Saint Petersburg)
- OKTMO ID: 40361000

Zelenogorsk (Russian: Зеленого́рск), known as Terijoki prior to 1948 (a name still used in Finnish and Swedish), is a municipal town in Kurortny District of the federal city of St. Petersburg, Russia, located in part of the Karelian Isthmus on the shore of the Gulf of Finland. Population: 14,958 (2010 census); 12,074 (2002 census); 13,032 (1989 Soviet census).

It has a station on the St. Petersburg-Vyborg railroad. It is located about 50 kilometers (31 mi) northwest of central Saint Petersburg.

== Early history ==
From 1323 to 1721 the Zelenogorsk area was a part of Sweden. It was ceded to Russia in 1721, becoming "Old Finland", which again was united with the Grand-Duchy of Finland in 1811. Until 1917, Terijoki was part of the Grand-Duchy of Finland, ruled by the Grand Dukes of Finland, who were the Tsars of Russia, (1812–1917).

== The Grand Duchy of Finland 1809-1917 ==
Even though all of the Grand Duchy of Finland was part of the Russian Empire, a customs border was located at Terijoki. A valid passport was needed for crossing the border between Russia and the Grand Duchy of Finland.

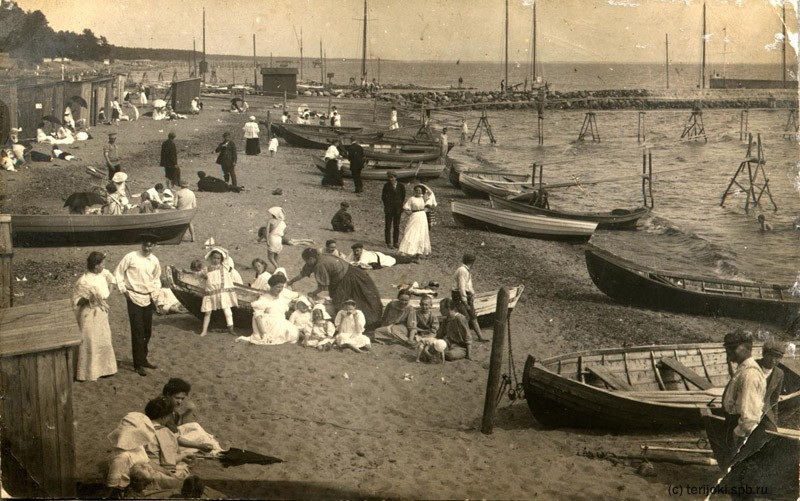
Summer visitors in 1915.

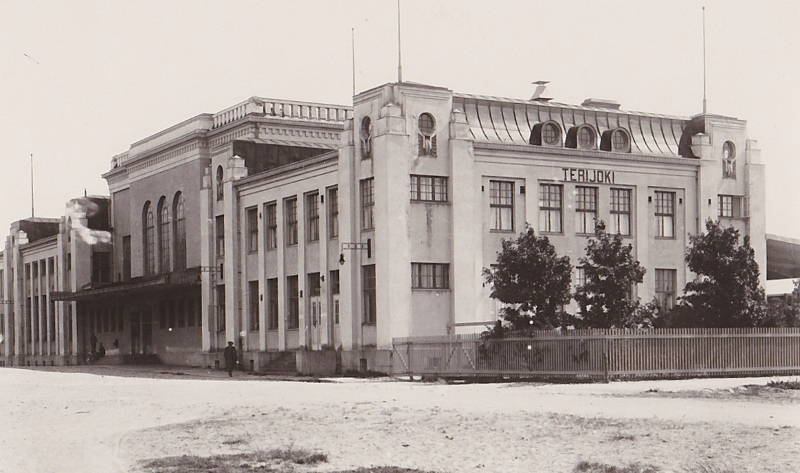
Terijoki railway station in 1917. The style of the railway station represented the Art Nouveau.

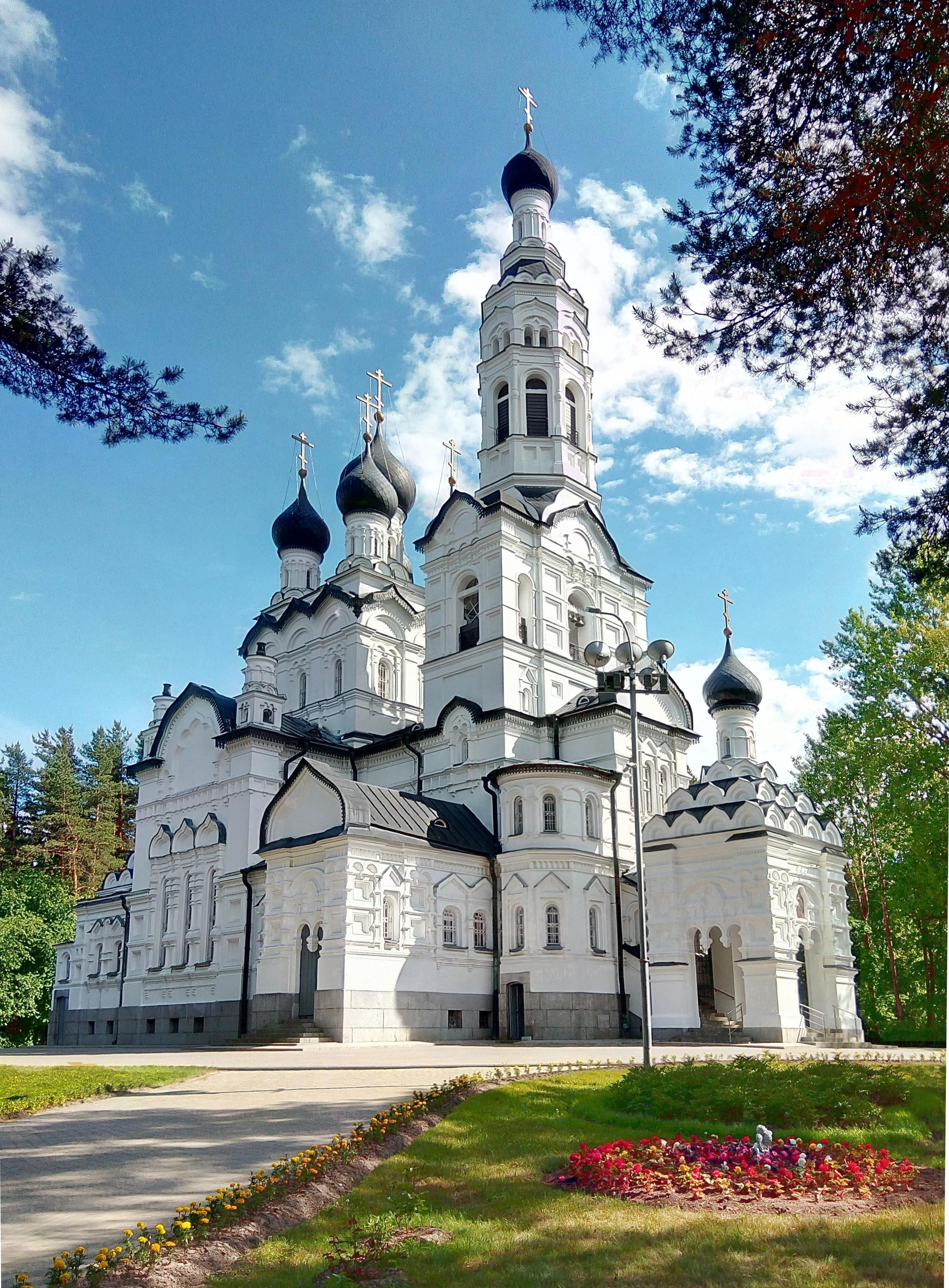
Church of Our Lady of Kazan in Terijoki. The church was constructed in 1913.

Members of the Russian upper class visited Terijoki. Among them were princes, counts, officials, and merchants.

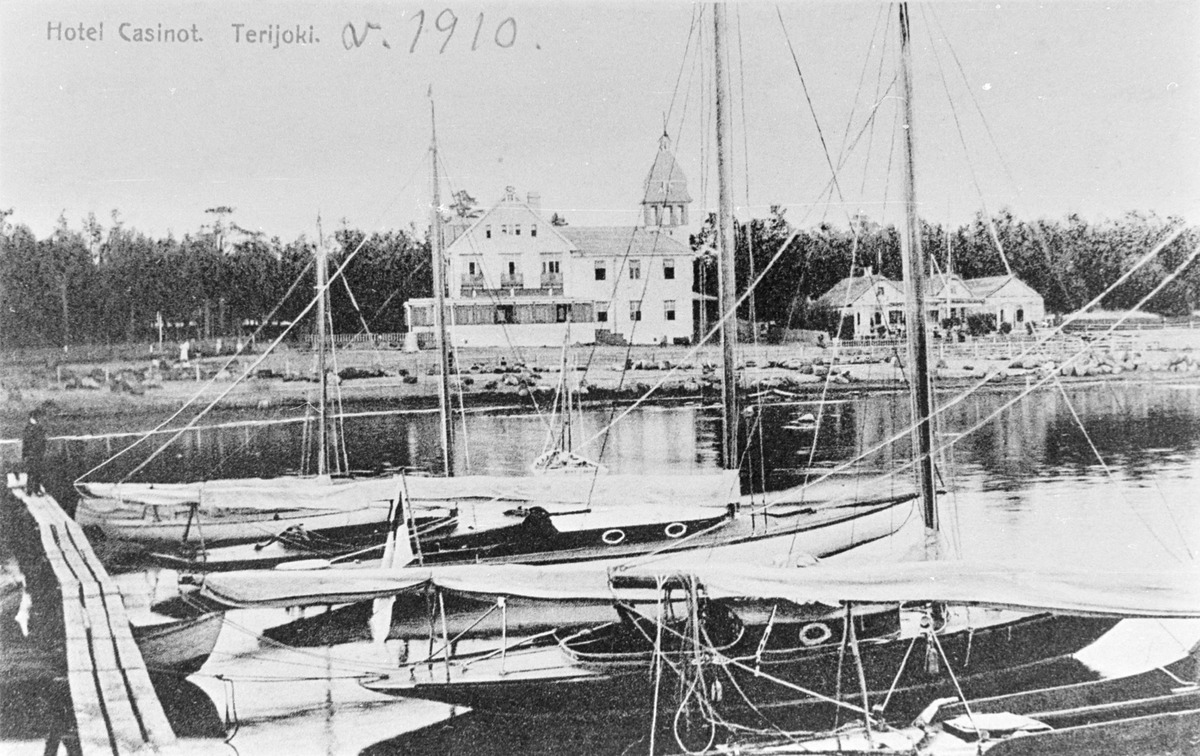
Hotel Casinot in 1910.

Vladimir Lenin managed to travel in secrecy over the internal border to Finland in 1907. Ten years later, in April 1917, he would return through the Terijoki border control at the head of the contingent of Bolshevik exiles that had accompanied him from Switzerland. The secret police of the German Empire supported Lenin and his comrades' journey towards Petrograd.

== The Republic of Finland 1917-1944 ==
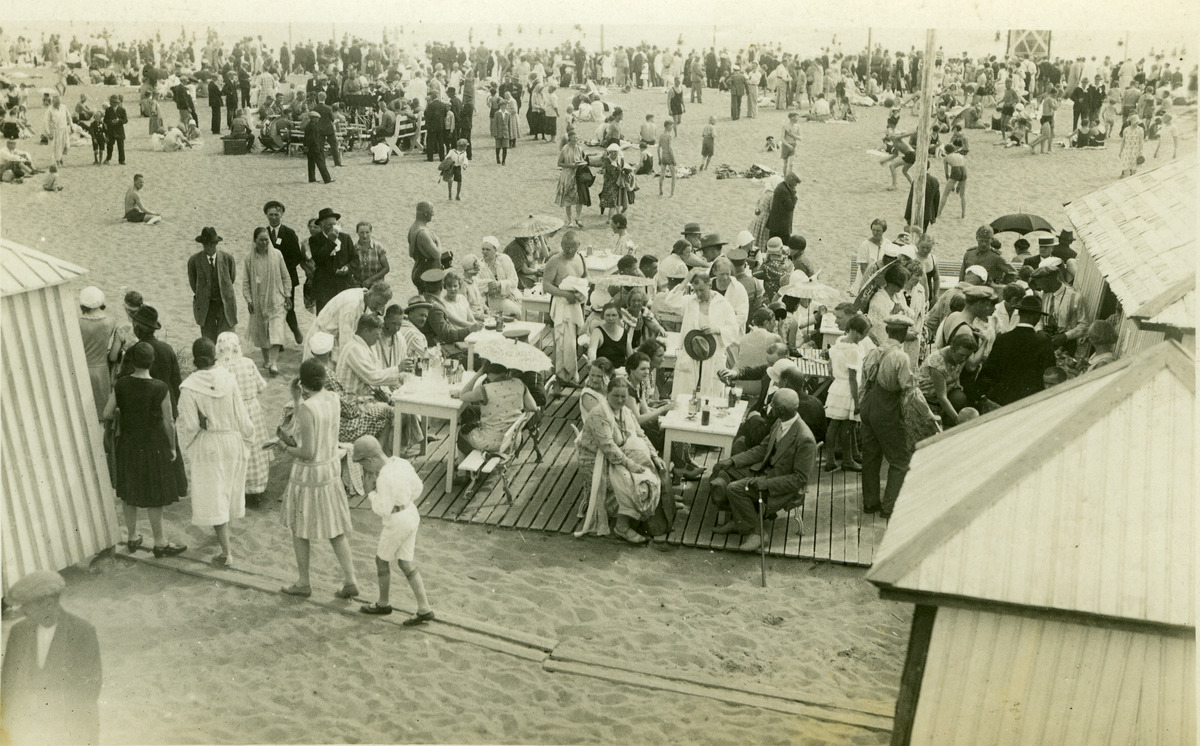
Finns enjoying the beach life in the 1920s.

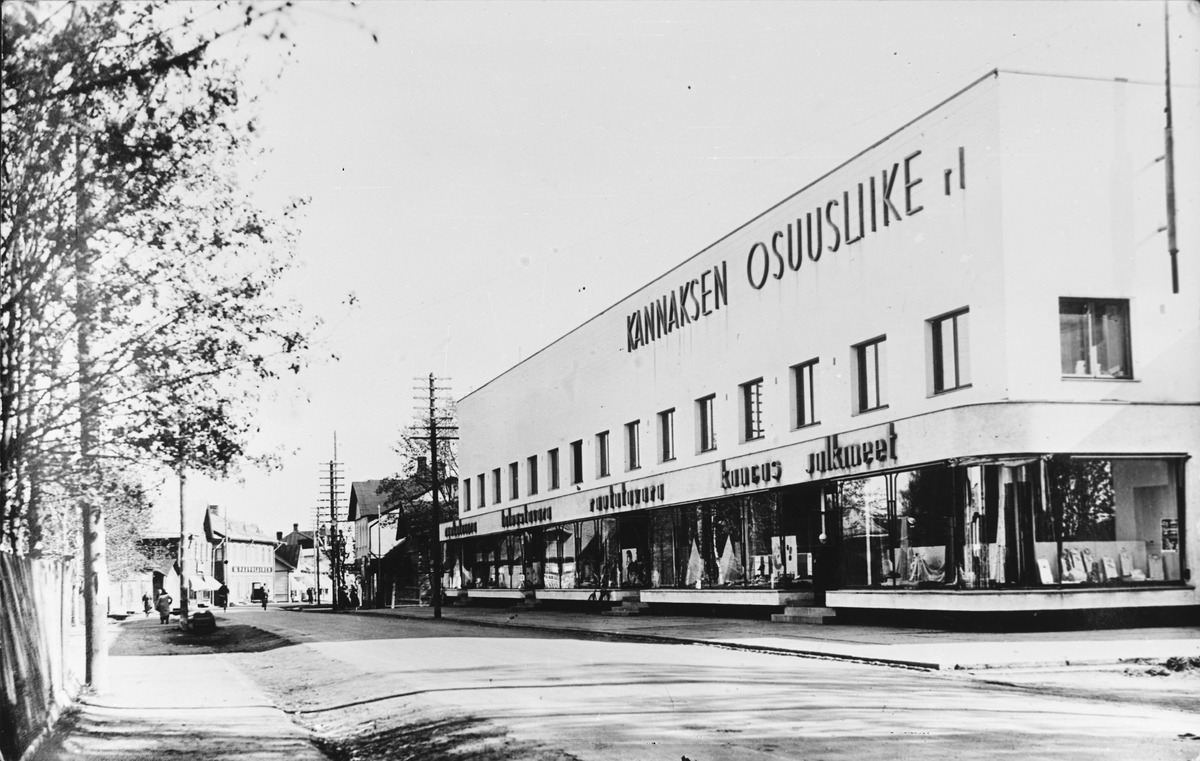
Modern Terijoki. The building of the Terijoki Karelian Isthmus Cooperative represented the modern functionalist architectural style in the 1930s.

After the Second World War, its original Finnish population was expelled. They were relocated close to Helsinki and Soviet citizens were relocated to Terijoki.

== The Soviet Union and the Russian Federation 1944- ==
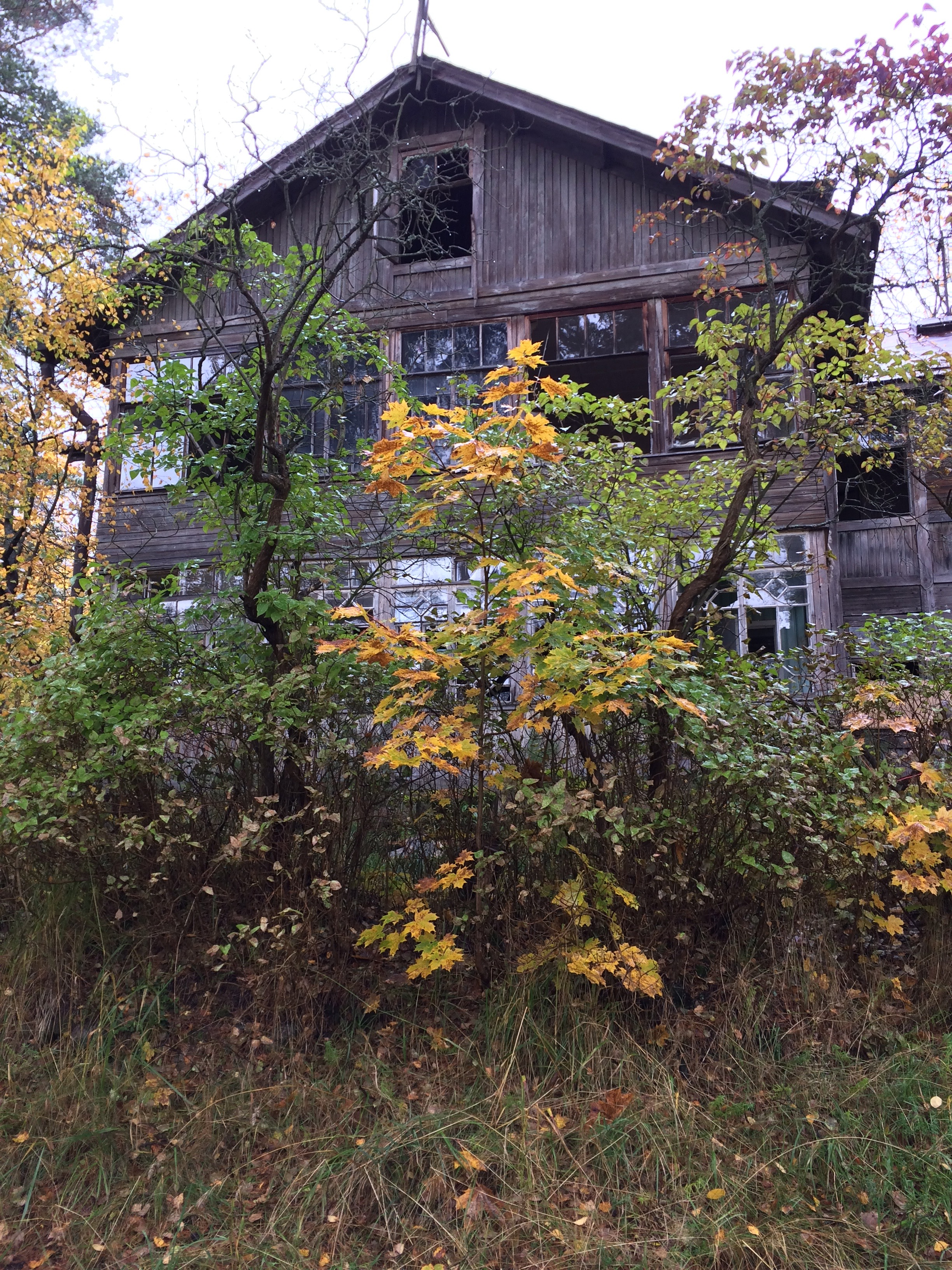
An old villa in Terijoki.

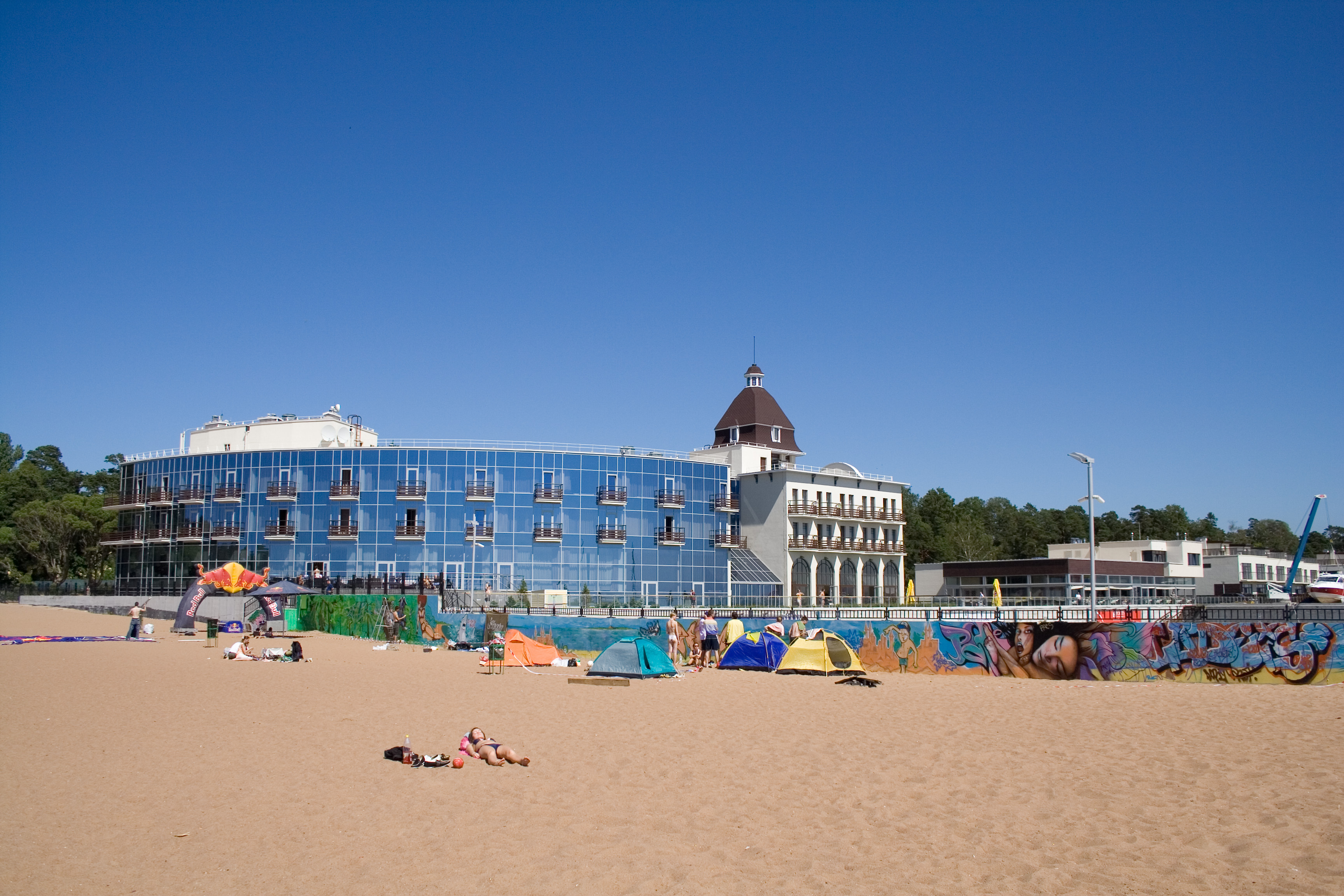
Zelenogorsk in 2010.

Terijoki remained part of Finland until it was occupied by the Soviet Union during the Winter War (1939-1940). During the Winter War Terijoki become known as the seat of Otto Wille Kuusinen's Finnish Democratic Republic. It was regained by Finland in 1941 during the Continuation War (1941-1944), but was then occupied again by the Red Army during the later stages of the same war and annexed to the Soviet Union in 1944.

Many villas were left to deteriorate and eventually rotted where they stood.

As of the beginning of the 21st century, Zelenogorsk is actively developing in many directions. Various actions to improve the quality of life in Zelenogorsk and modernize the region have been undertaken.

Around the start of the 21st century, the town's population was estimated to have been a few thousand, rising to above 50,000 in summer.

July 25 is the date of the annually celebrated City Day. On this day in 2009, a fountain was opened in the central square of the city park, and a sculpture named "Boots of the Traveller" was solemnly unveiled along the central avenue.

At the Dachshund monument, parades of dachshunds have been held, and the museum of vintage vehicles has gained additional new exhibits.

At a concert in honor of City Day in 2009, known musicians performed, such as Music hall theatre of St. Petersburg, Edita Piekha, and others,

== Politics ==
The current body of local government - the Municipal Council - has been operating since 1998. In the elections on 19 September 2014, the 5th convocation was elected (10 deputies - 4 of those from United Russia). The head of the municipal entity (who exercises the powers of the chairman of the Municipal Council and is the highest official of the municipal entity) is the executive and administrative body of the municipality - the Local Administration.

== Notable people ==
- Anna Akhmatova, poet
- Ivan Pavlov, neurologist
- Iljya Repin, painter
- Boris Smyslovsky, military officer
- Viljo Vesterinen, musician (famous for his rendition of Säkkijarven Polkka)

== Images ==
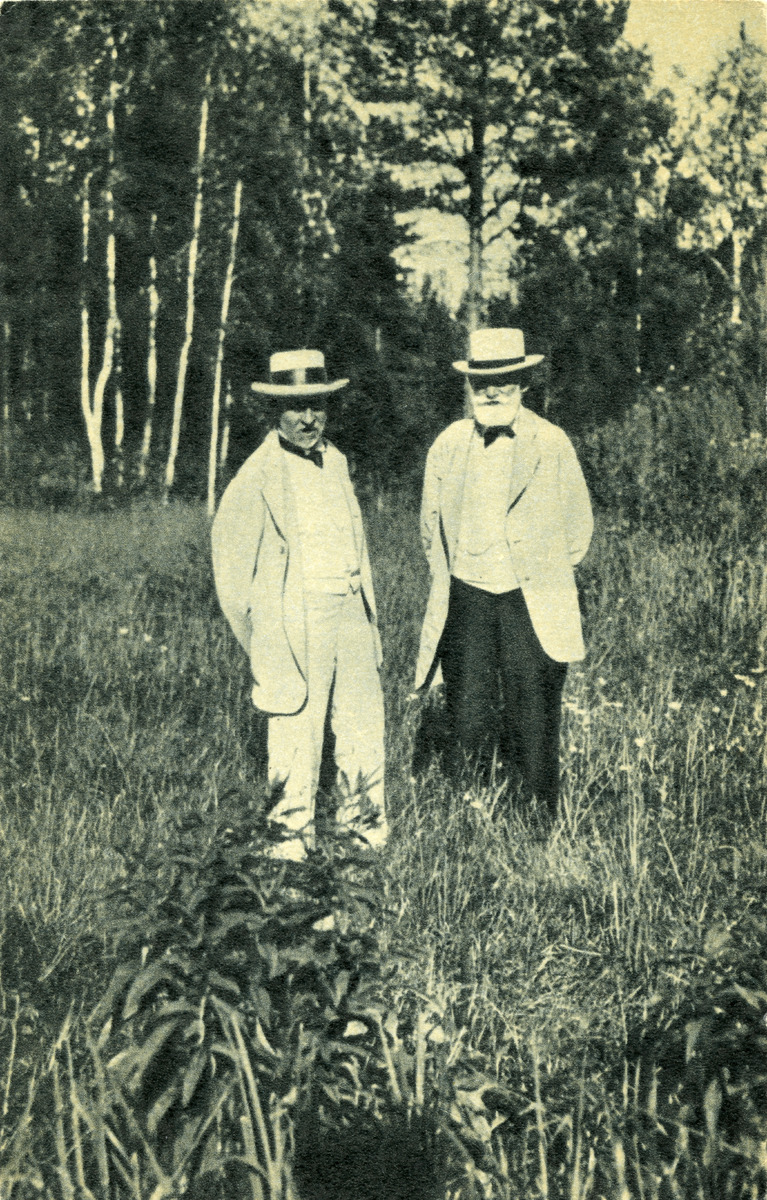
Ilya Repin and Ivan Pavlov in Terijoki in the 1920s.

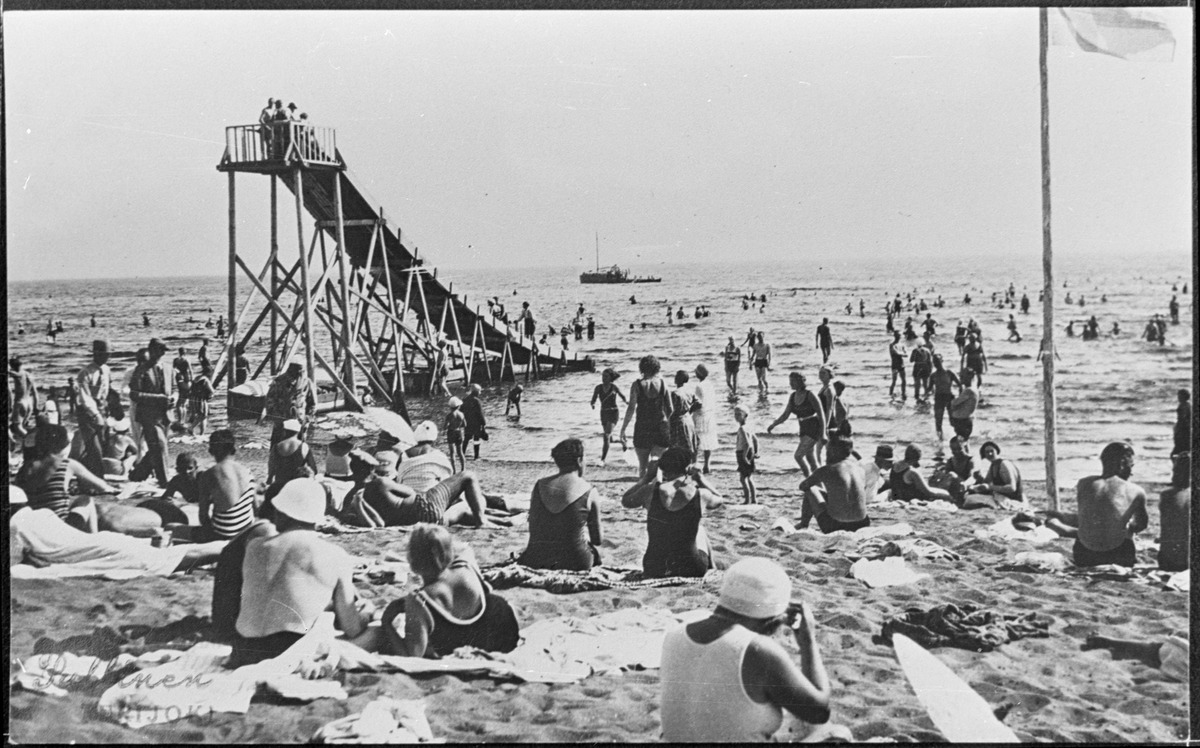
Terijoki in the 1920s. Finns enjoying the beach life.

Unofficial Finnish coat of arms of Terijoki, designed by Heikki Toivola and taken into use in 1956.

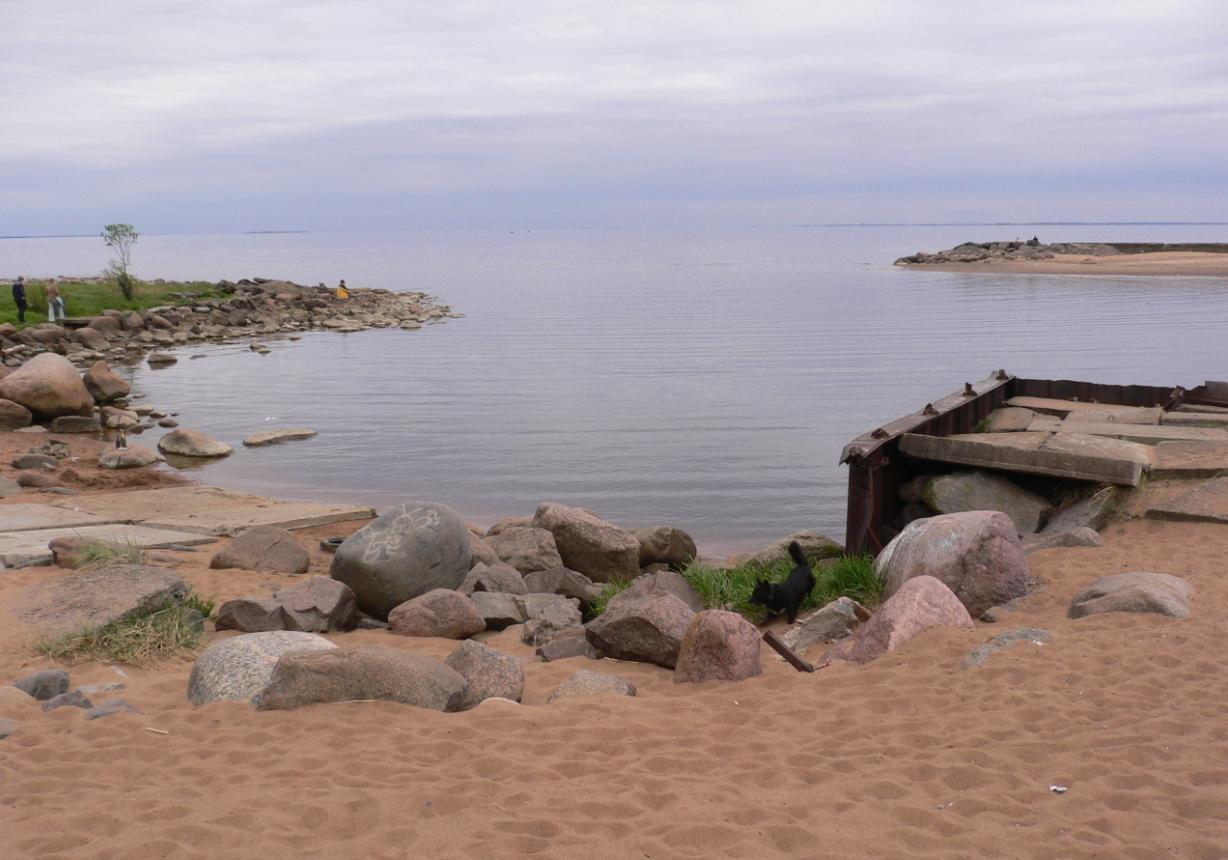
Gulf of Finland coast at Zelenogorsk
