= Edgar Johan Kuusik =

Estonian architect

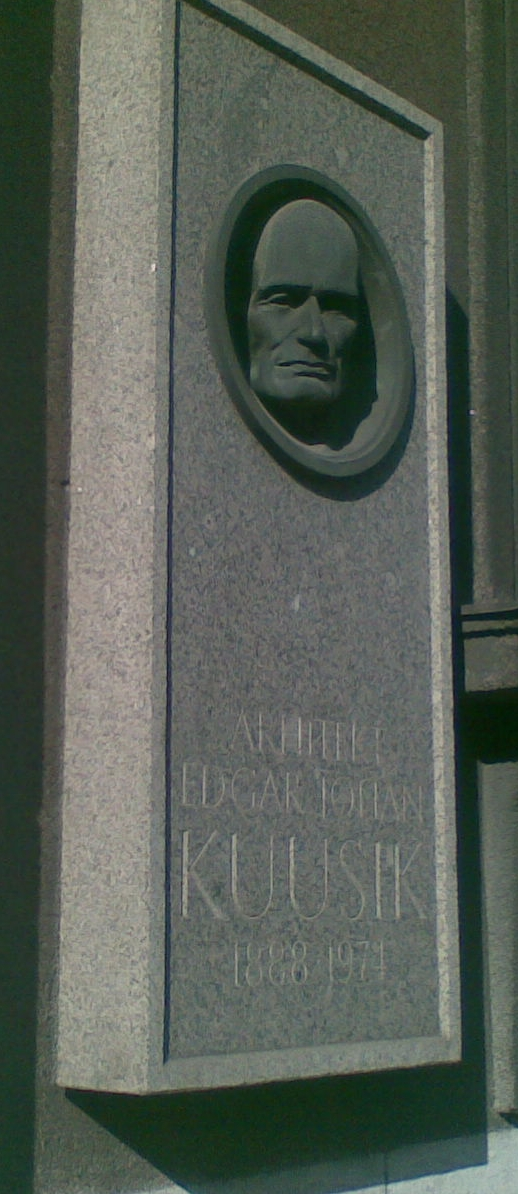
Kuusik's relief on Gonsiori 17 building, Tallinn

Edgar Johan Kuusik (22 February 1888 – 3 August 1974) was an Estonian architect and furniture and interior designer.

== Biography ==
Kuusik was born in Valgjärve, Võrumaa, into a family who were masters of the Pikajärve mansion. He studied at Tartu Reaalkool from 1899 to 1906 and, from 1906, at the Riga Polytechnic Institute, from which he graduated in 1914 as an architect. After graduation, he travelled around Finland, where he had hoped to return in the autumn of 1914 to work in Eliel Saarinen's architectural bureau. However, at the outbreak of World War One he was forced to change his plans. He couldn't find a job in Estonia, so he decided to go to St. Petersburg where he worked for an architect named B. von Hueck. During World War I he worked as a commander for war remediation, and in 1916-1918, he worked in the construction department of the Peter the Great`s naval fortress in Tallinn, Pagari Street. He volunteered on 1. December 1918 to serve in the Estonian army during the Estonian war of Independence. He was present at battles against the Red Army in the Narva and Pihkva frontals, in Southern -Estonia, and in Latvia. From May 1919, he started working as an officer deputy. He was released from service in May 1920, after which point he received the Cross of Liberty.

From 1920 to 1922, he worked in the road construction ministry as Eugen Habermann's helper. He was also part of the Estonian Association of Architects which was formed in 1922. In 1922 Kuusik travelled around Germany and from 1923 to 1924, Italy and France. From the years 1922 to 1937, he was a freelancer. That is also the time when most of his architectural masterpieces were born.

During World War II he worked as a German Technical Translator in Construction Management. The following years, 1944–1950, he was the head of the Department of interior design of the Estonian SSR, in 1946 he was a professor, and from the year 1950 he was a lecturer at the Department of Architecture.

In 1945, Kuusik joined the Estonian SSR Architects' Union, but at the beginning of the 1950s he was removed from the list because of his past. From 1950 to 1952 Kuusik was expelled from the Estonian SSR Architects' Union, but he was still able to work as a lecturer at the State Institute of the Estonian SSR. In 1968 he was named as the sovereign architect of the Estonian SSR.

In addition to the practical cultivation of architecture, Kuusk was also a productive writer in the section of the architecture. He has dealt with architecture as a symbol of Estonia and written about furniture and ornamentation, the content and form of the problem in architecture and other constructions related to the practical and theoretical questions. In 1973 Kuusik published the book "Construction Engineering", which became the architectural textbook for several generations of Estonian architects.

Kuusik died in Tallinn in 1974.

== Works ==
The works of Kuusik include a number of specially designed buildings: the Abja-Paluoja Bank House (1929, later the post office), the Tallinn Art Hall (1934, with Anton Soans), the premises of the Chamber of Commerce and Industry in Tallinn at the former Kanuti Guild Building (1933), the modern cinema of the beginning of the 1930s in Tallinn, cinemas "Modern" (destroyed) and "Helios" (standing vacant), the Võru Department building of Eesti Pank (1938, with Anton Soans), the Republican Officers Central Council casino in Tallinn, Sakala 3 (1939–47).

In addition, Kuusik has designed a large number of functional small houses and apartment buildings in the city of Tallinn (Sakala 4 and Tina 17, both 1936; Gonsiori 17, 1937 and more), also in Tallinn's first modern Maasika and Vaarika district. At the beginning of the 1920s, Kuusik was involved in the design of residential buildings in Neeme Street in Kopli. Altogether, based on his project, a wooden single family dwelling house with a deck lined with lobbies lined up was built. Most of the buildings were completed in the period 1924–25. In Tartu, he designed Tammelinna and beautiful city rental houses, for example, K. E. v. Baeri 1 and Liiva 17. Kuusik participated in more than 50 architectural competitions, in addition to planning and designing furniture.

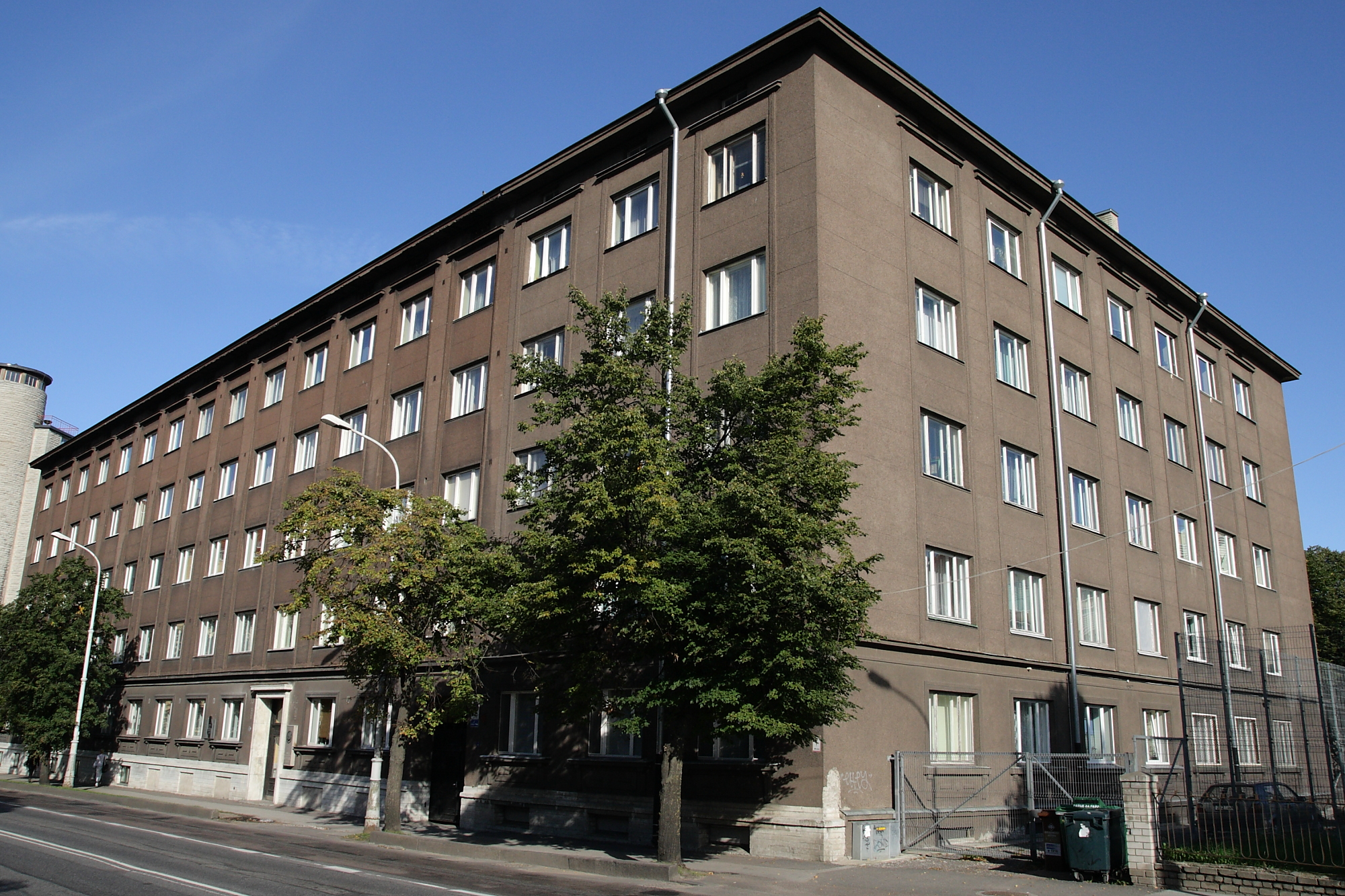
Gonsiori 17, Tallinn

=== Tallinn Art house (1934) ===
Estonian artists created the idea of building their exhibition spaces already in the early 1920s. In 1925, the Cultural Endowment Act was adopted and the Provisional Government for Impressions of Arts (KKSV) was established to direct the development of visual arts. In the 1930s the concept of the construction of the Art Building became more specific. Former Tallinn city architect Herbert Johanson offered a plot at Freedom Square, next to the conservatory near the city wall. In order to apply for a plot, Edgar Johan Kuusik, a member of the KKSV, prepared a six-floor pre-project in 1932 for an art building. In general, it was a great deal of pleasure, but a five-story building was required. In October 1932, the Tallinn City Council allocated 1,398.5 square meters of land to the KKSV under the Obrock Agreement. Some of the lands were reserved for transfer to the KKSV for the expansion of the art building. The plot of the art building was separated from real estate 486A and 621. The neighboring plots belonged to the House Owners Bank (to the West) and the Conservatory (to the east). A plan for the restoration of the artistic estate established a new construction line between Freedom Square and Harju and Jaani streets. Architect Kuusik continued to design the art building until it became clear that the board of the KKSV demanded the organization of the competition.

The competition was announced in October 1932. Kuusik did not participate because he was competing in the competition. The room program of the building being designed was very economical due to the limited possibilities. The height of the five-storey building was 18.5 meters. Business premises were planned on the ground floor, a lobby room, two sculptor studios; exhibition halls on the second floor; office space on the third floor; and studios on the fourth to fifth floor with a possibility of living with them. The building requirements of the plot were fixed to the architect's frames. The T-shape of the building was due to the requirements of the Tallinn Building Regulation. The height of the building could not exceed double the width of the spacer - this led to a decrease in the surface of the exhibition rooms. The "Public Buildings Regulation" required the separation of stairwells from apartments in public, in this case staircase of exhibition rooms.

38 projects were submitted to the competition in March 1933. In Estonia, there were 60 architects around, so the interest in participating in the competition was very high. The jury gave the lead to the Anton Soans project. The records of the building committee building committee show that on 1 June, Soans was tasked with drawing up the final project of the art building. According to E. Kuusik, Soans was "so noble" that he invited him to work together. Kuusik accepted it with pleasure. On 15 June, the original project of Soans-Kuusik was approved.

The facade composition of Soansi-Kuusik Art Hall is different from the Soans Competition. Architects worked hard on façade options. The final result, the facade executed, is the best of the searches - monumental and also elegant. Constructivist techniques are applied in great detail, which are expressed in both large glass surfaces and in the solution of the entrance. The facade composition of the art building is characterized by symmetry and classical thinking. The cubic building element of the building rests on two pillars; the windows of the constructivist glass display is also a bearer of the symbolic meaning of the building. The contrast between functional and decorative elements creates unexpected artistic tension. This is complemented by the expressive color scheme of the building - a pink terrazzo wall surface (achieved by mixing white stone marble rubble, red brick and black English coal with cement), polished granite red poles; black window frames; and light floor space in the outer space.

The construction of the art building began in June 1933. The contractors were the brothers Edenbergs'; technical supervision was carried out by architect Kuusik. The building was finished for the winter, and the building was under the roof. The interior was carried out in the winter of 1933/1934. The work was handed out to a few entrepreneurs through a smaller deal. During the course of the project, minor changes and refinements were made to the project, which are reflected in the final version of the project. The biggest difference was the fastening of the roundabouts of the front panel and the replacement of sculptural linings.

Drawings of interior decoration and details of the art building were prepared by E. J. Kuusik. Kuusik also designed the furniture - a long ping-pong table, which was performed at the Luther factory and the Art Club's interior. If the exterior doors of the building are functional, then the interior doors will be decorated with a typical Kuusik. Kuusik has written, "... ornamentation is essentially so closely related to the construction, that we cannot imagine a vivid construction of art without ornamentation. The question here can only be, in so far as the abstract nature should be ornamentation for this building. " In the interiors of the art building - doorways, stairwell window distribution, vestibule floor, stairway, etc.—Kuusik used an abstract geometric decoration (circular tondo door and window frame design, low relief horizontal boards and profiles for ornaments on doors, etc.). The interior of the showrooms was light, the walls were covered with a blue-white oil paint. The big hall was lit up by the roof window. The light bulb has been maintained, cleaned and replaced by a technical floor located above the hall. The luminaries were hung on the ceiling of the Freedom Square, the larger spherical so-called Saturn lamp illuminated the interiors. There were parquet floors in the hallways, a floor with a geometric pattern in the wardrobe lining, the design and color scheme of which was designed by Kuusik. The retained cloaked racks and barriers are also original.

The art building was completed and opened on 15 September 1934 with an art exhibition. President K. Päts concluded his opening address with the words "... if this art stamp is only addressed to serious art, I want to make sure that this art building is left to the forefront of artists forever. I will give this building to artists. "In 1940, the Art Hall was nationalized and handed over to the ENSV Arts Foundation. In the March 1944 air strikes, the art building was damaged - windows, luminaire and other furnishings shattered. Money for the renovation of the building was obtained from the Allied Fund.

From 1959 to 1962, an overhead construction of the art building was designed and performed according to the sketch by E. J. Kuusik (Luik from the preliminary draft). The basement and the first floor were reinforced, and the columns were surrounded by Febet shirts with pre-tensioned spiral armor. Awnings were built above the windows of the first floor stores, so the original "window-lifting mechanisms" were demolished. The entire facade was covered with a new granite grinder while maintaining its original color, and the courtyard facade was covered with a lubricant grinder. The reconstruction of the building was aligned with the height of the Art Hall of the Art Foundation building (1948-1953, architect Alar Kotli), but the original proportions of the façade were violated. It is a protected national cultural monument (reg. No. 3093).

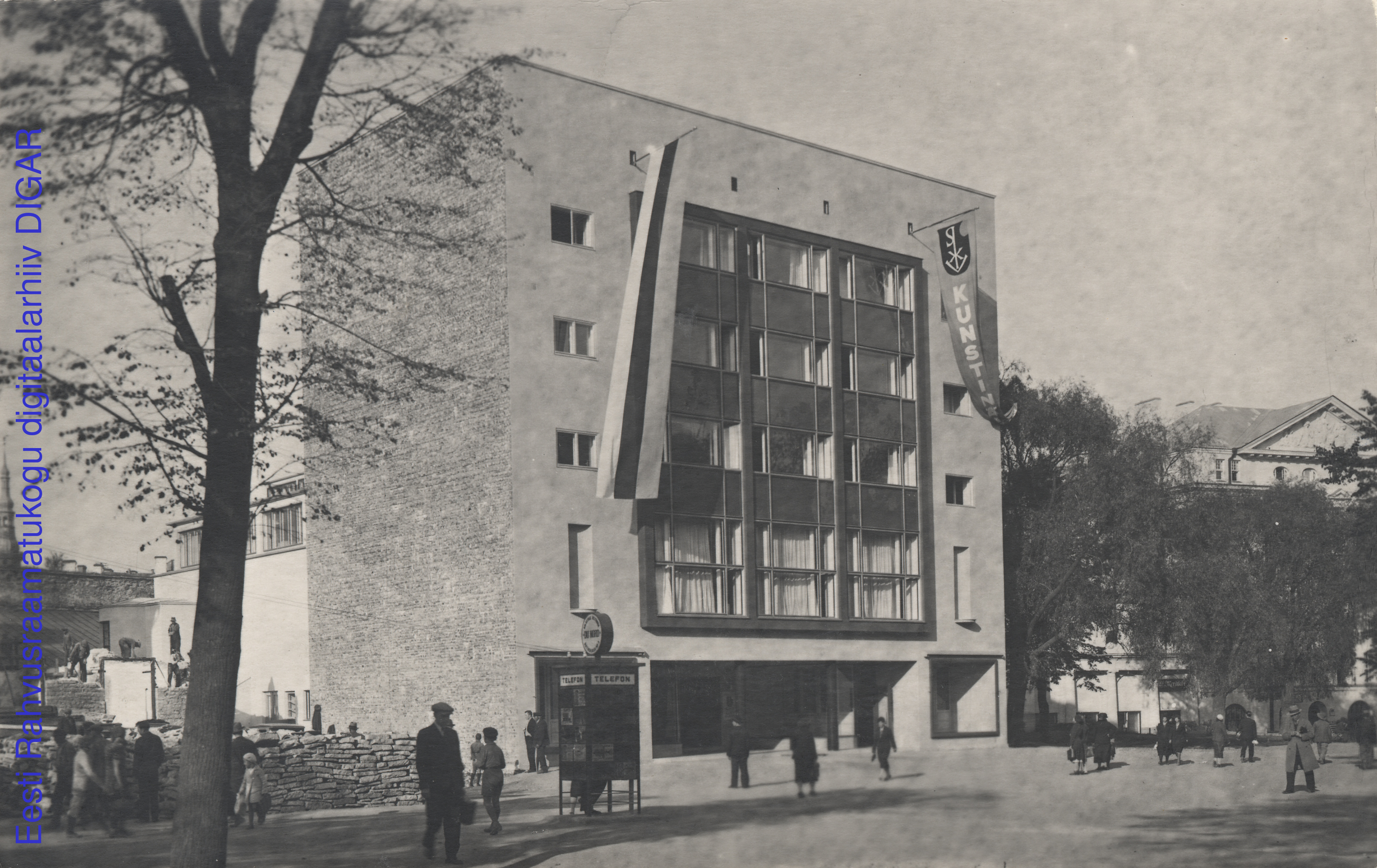
Art hall in 1930s.

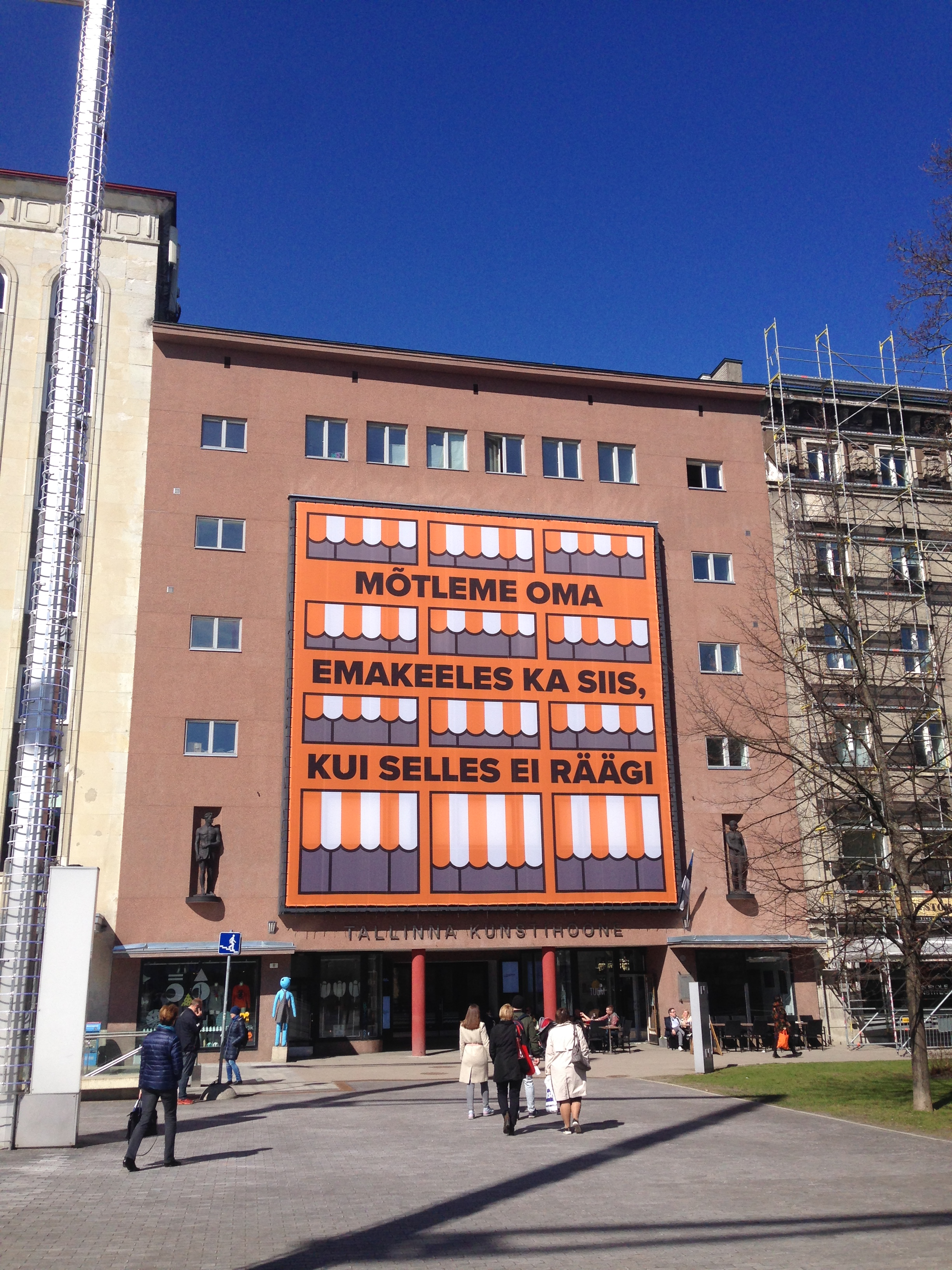
Building in year 2018.

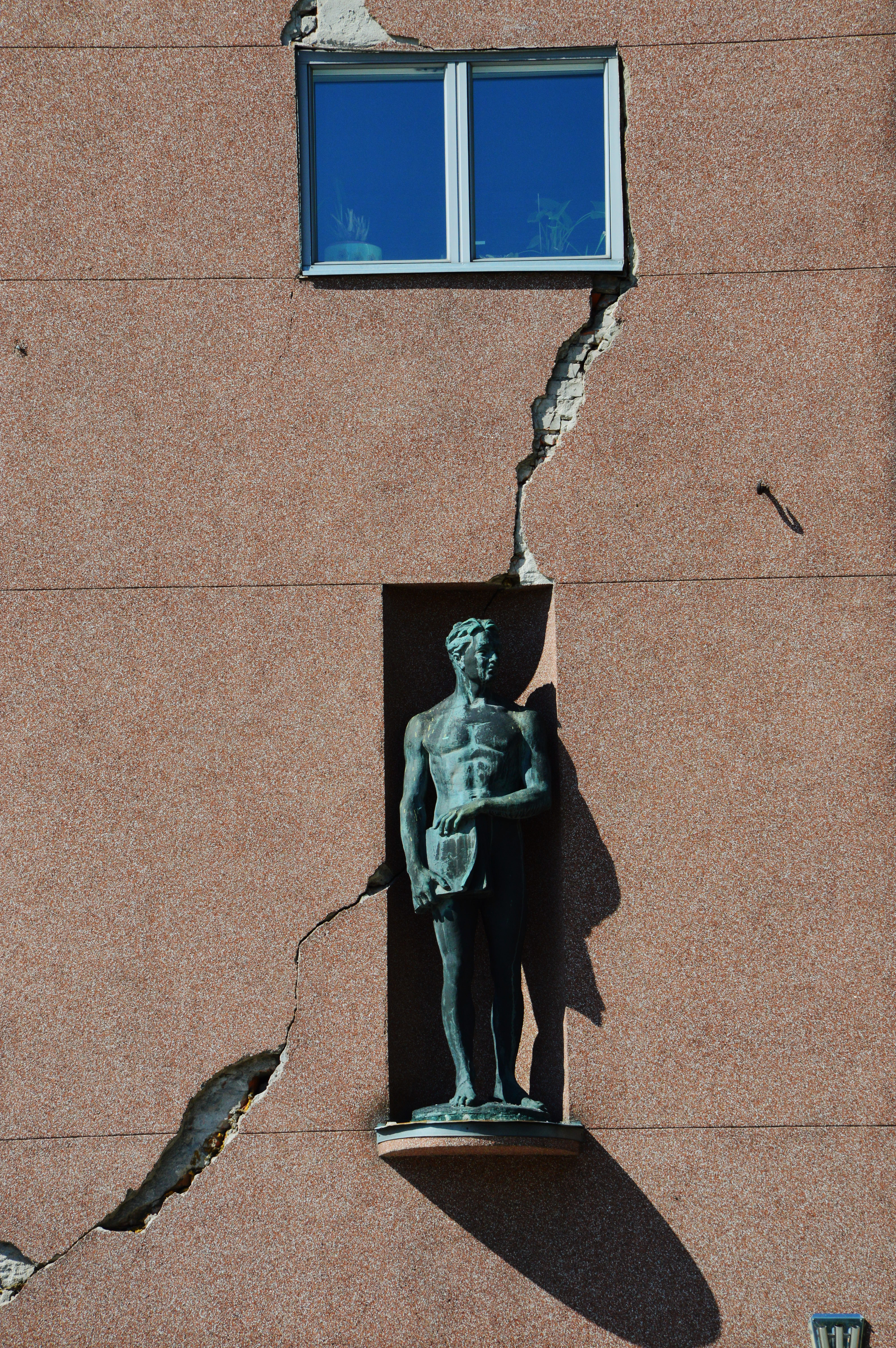
A sculpture on the wall of the Art house.

=== Officers' Cinema (1938-1947) ===
Launched in the pre-war construction, the building designed for the casino was completed as the Working People's Culture Building. This is the only representative office that E. J. Kuusik has projected. The main facade of the building faces the Sakala Street, slightly away from the street. The winged hammer marks the backing of the main facade. The central union of the building, which emphasizes the main part and the entrance, is designed on the portico and the edges with pairs of piers. Decorative window frames emphasizing the festivity of the facade, which appear sto be contrastingly highlighting on the dark surface of the plaster. The original solution was much more decorative and surprisingly cheerful for military architecture. Most of the planned gazebo was not performed; after the war, the architect designed new elements of Soviet insignia. The interior of the hall has survived, except sculptures in the big hall, gorgeous parade staircase, and original crystal chandeliers.

In 2000-2001 one of the halls was renovated for the theater hall of the Old Town Theater, and the roof floor was added (the project was commissioned by I. Raud). The building of Sakala 4 residential building (1935–36) is also planned by E. Kuusik.

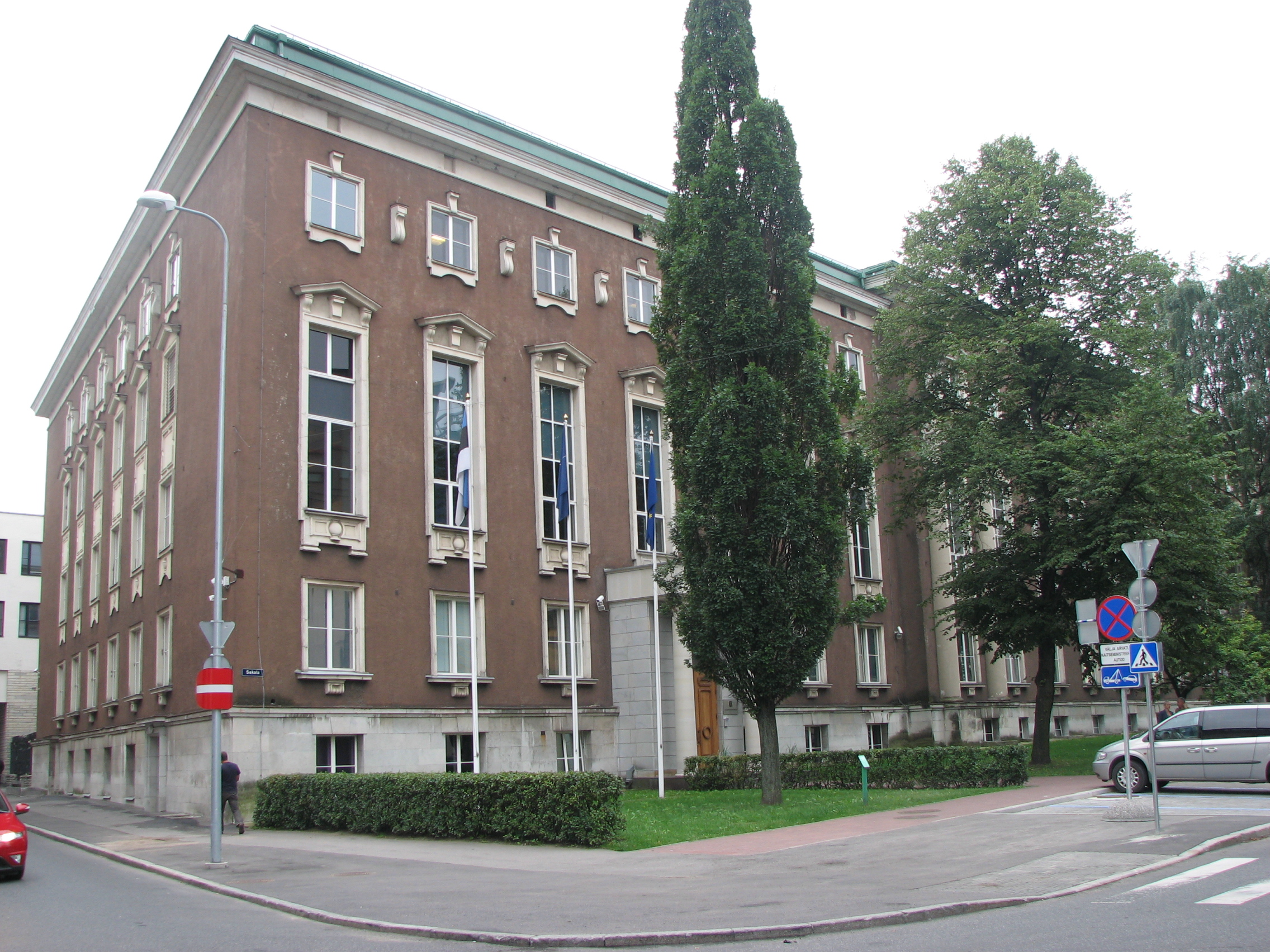
The house nowadays.

=== Sakala 2/4 (1935-1936) ===
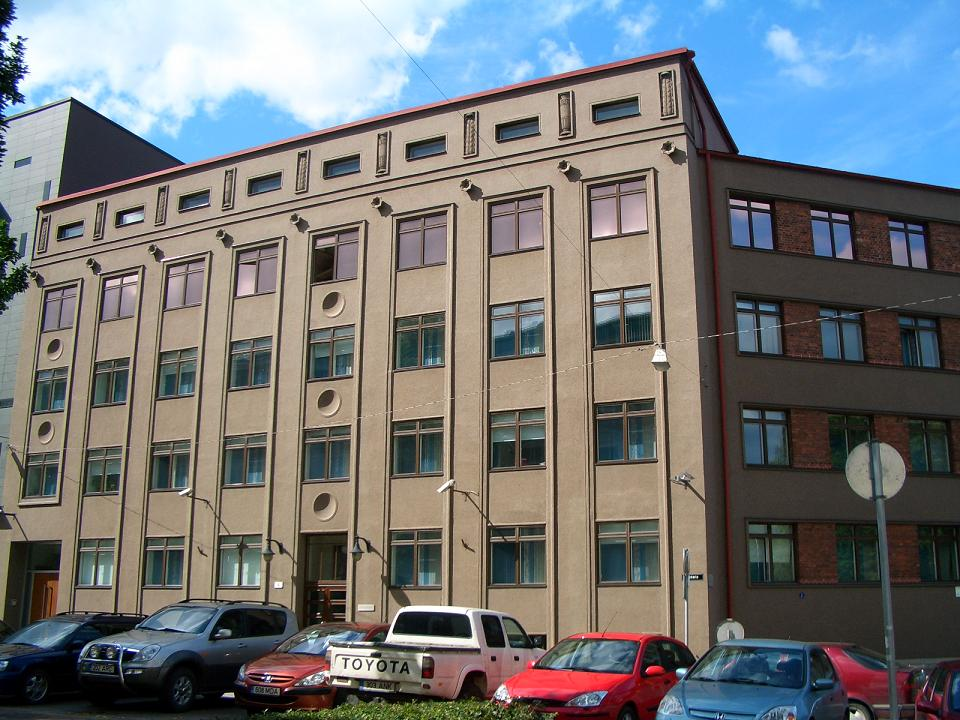
Sakala 2/4.

The building was completed in 1936. It has 4 floors, cellar, an attic room and a lift. The functional facade has a dark terracotta tile, the vertical alignment emphasizes the representation, the end wall of the upper part and the plastic groves and decorative reliefs used for decorating (sculptor A. Kaasik). The windows are placed on the facade surface, which adds softness to the building. The ascetic façade of the lower part of the building (Sakala street 2) is invaded by red-brick windows between the windows connecting the house to the adjacent bank building in Estonia pst. 11.

=== Uue tare district in Maasika and Vaarika street (1931-1932) ===
This is Tallinn's only functionalistic example, which was built according to a building competition. The author of the idea was Konstantin Bölau. In addition to Kuusik, the project included August Volberg, Erich Jacoby, Elmar Lohk and Franz de Vries. The initiation and implementation of this project marked the general breakthrough in flat-panel functionalism. The caverns designed by Kuusik are two-storeyed buildings on Maasika Street, with numbers of 3; 5; 7 and 9. Each apartment is designed on a separate floor. The loggers have tried to create the illusion of the Linux platform, but also the preservation of the shutters suggests that the expressions of functionalism are mistrustful.

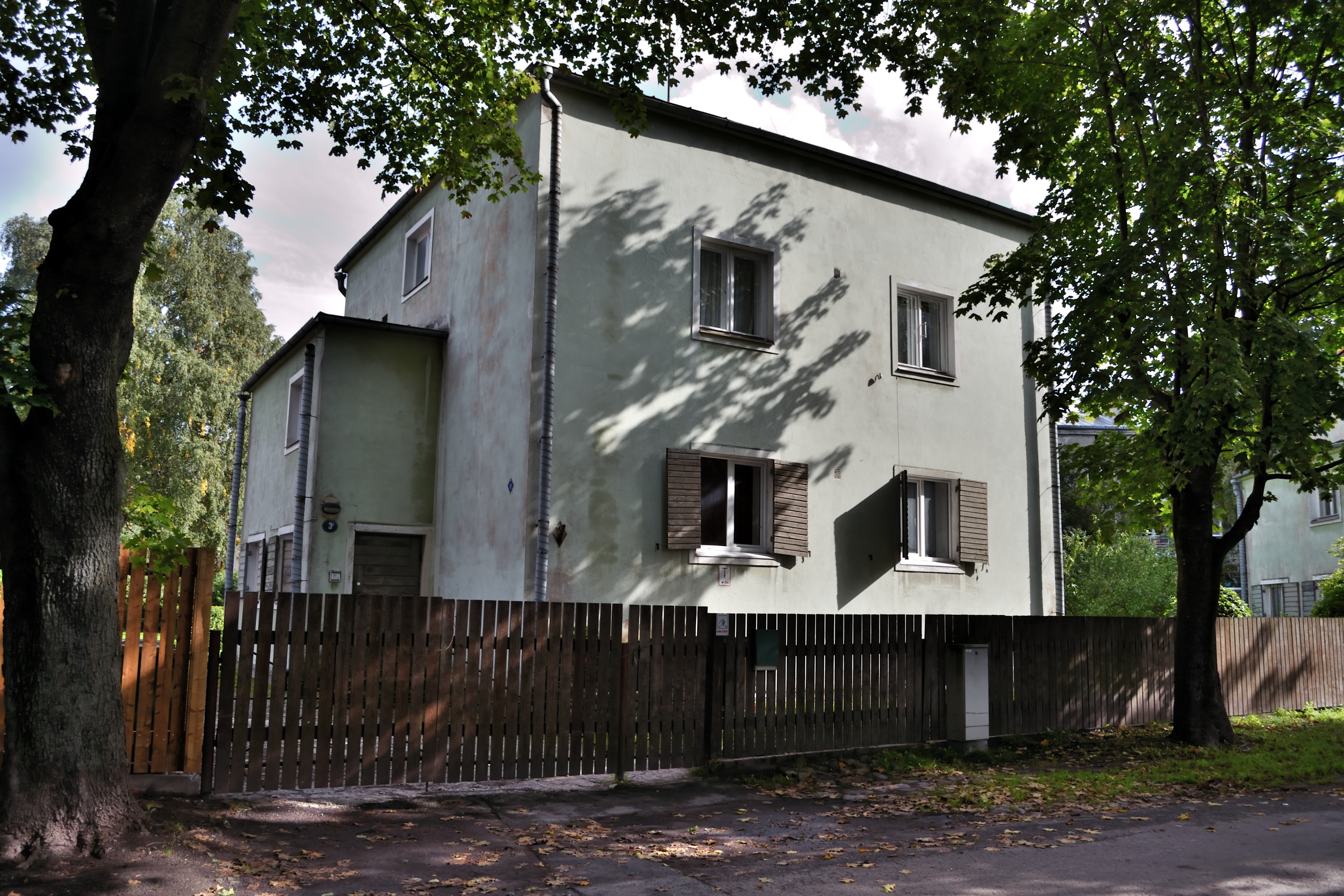
Maasika 3.

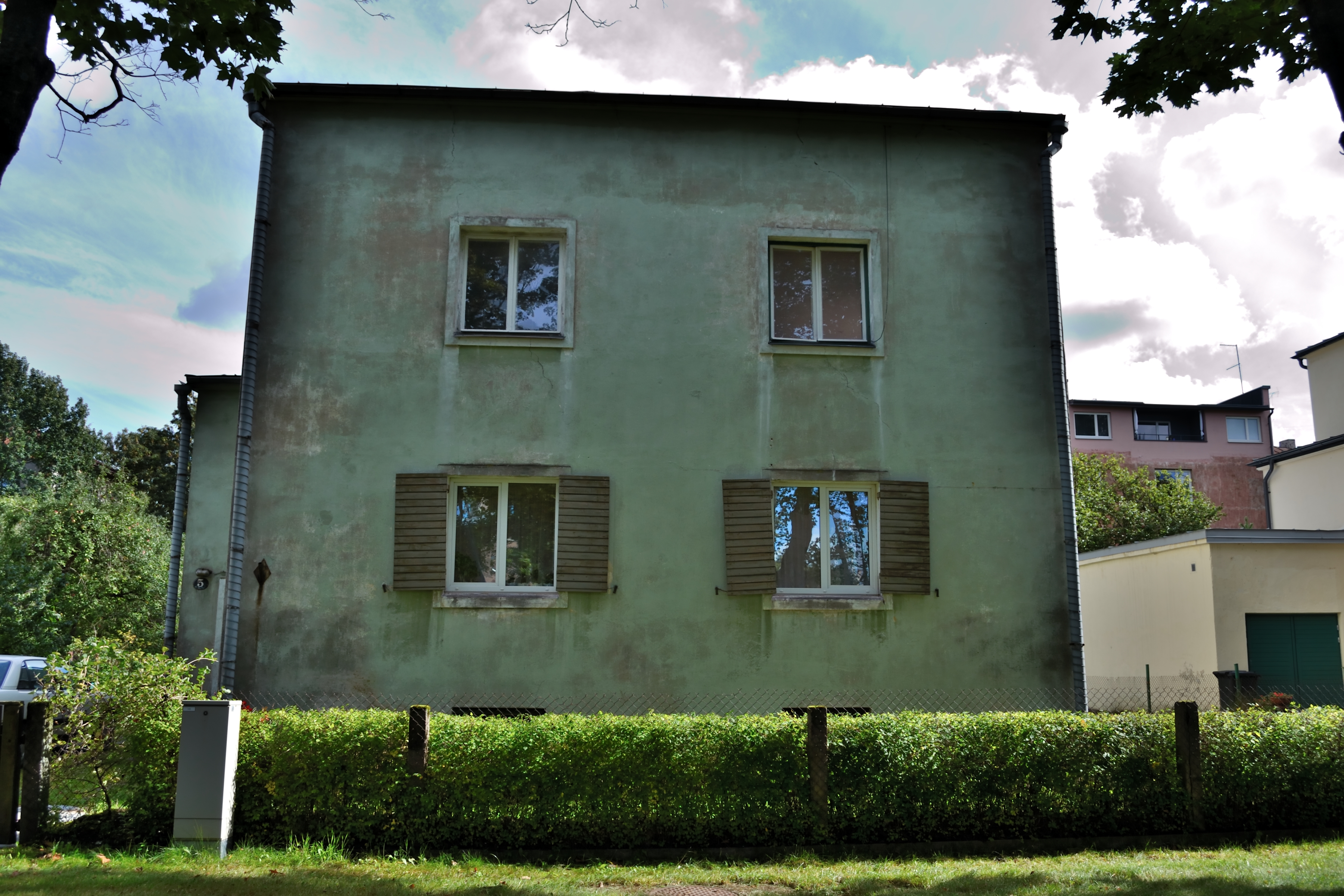
Maasika 5.

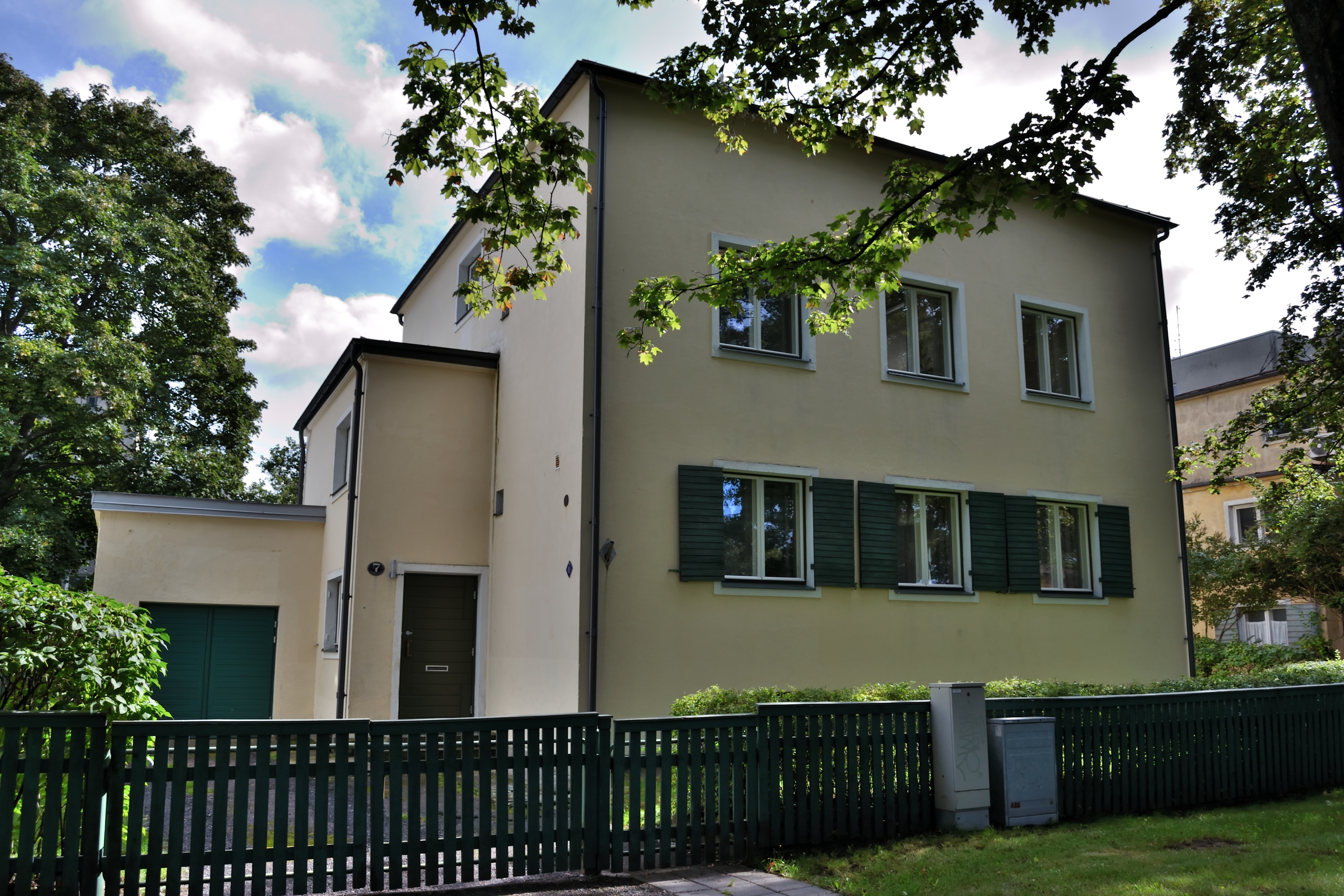
Maasika 7.

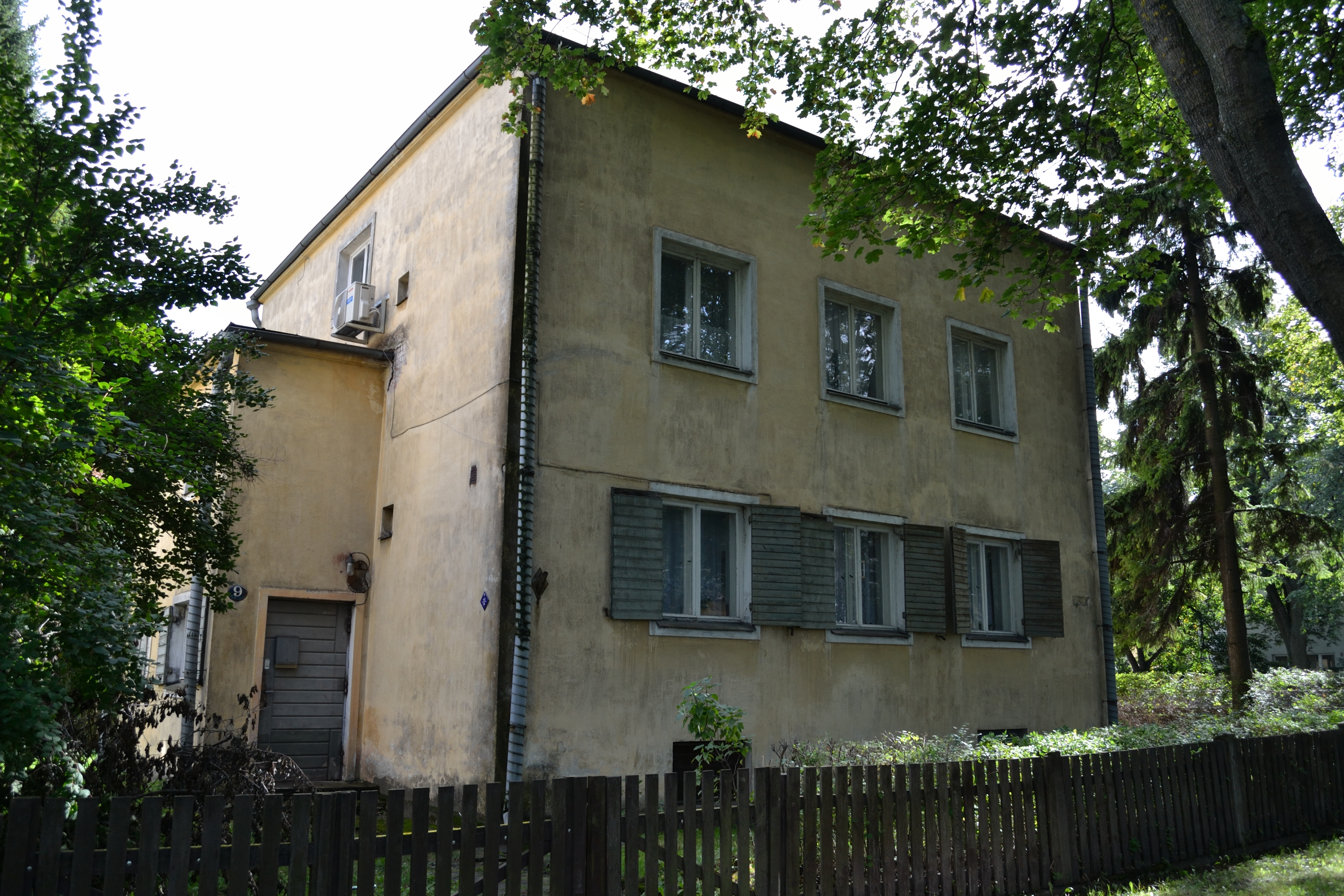
Maasika 9.

=== Nurme 40 (1935) ===
The functionalistic representation of a large alley-lined plot away from the street is planned in 1935. The commissioner was industrialist Oskar Kerson. Architect E. J. Kuusik, who himself designed interiors here and chose the furniture of the premises, made several variants of the project, because the original room program was changed during the construction phase. The architect was planning a so-called building as a growing house, where you can add the necessary space you need. An elegant building with asymmetric design, which at one time was one of the most spectacular modernist dwellings in Nõmme, has been severely damaged, but its total volume and a large part of the architecturally and historically valuable details have been preserved until now. Unfortunately, the furniture belonging to the building is not preserved. When the exterior of the flat-roofed building was radically fashionable at the time of its completion (fountains and round window, roof rack, etc.), the interior was designed in a very traditional style, and the stoked deck of the ceilings is a hit of centuries-old historicism. One of the reasons for the personal tastes of the additional customer was undoubtedly the fact that, as the embassy hosted the congregation, diplomats and others often gathered here. Higher society, therefore it was considered necessary to design the interior in an old fashioned style. The rooms are spacious, from one entrance to the entrance hall there was a gigantic salon for the private house and a dining room for the other side, where about twenty people could dine. In 1939, major renovations were made in the house, a nursery was built in the upper storey, and an additional storey of one building was placed in order to maintain the composition, in which auxiliary rooms were placed with a teenage dining room. At the time of the ENSV, several educational institutions were located in the building. From 1952 the Nõmme Pioneers' Palace was located there. Since 1997 the building has been protected as a national monument (Monument No 8181).

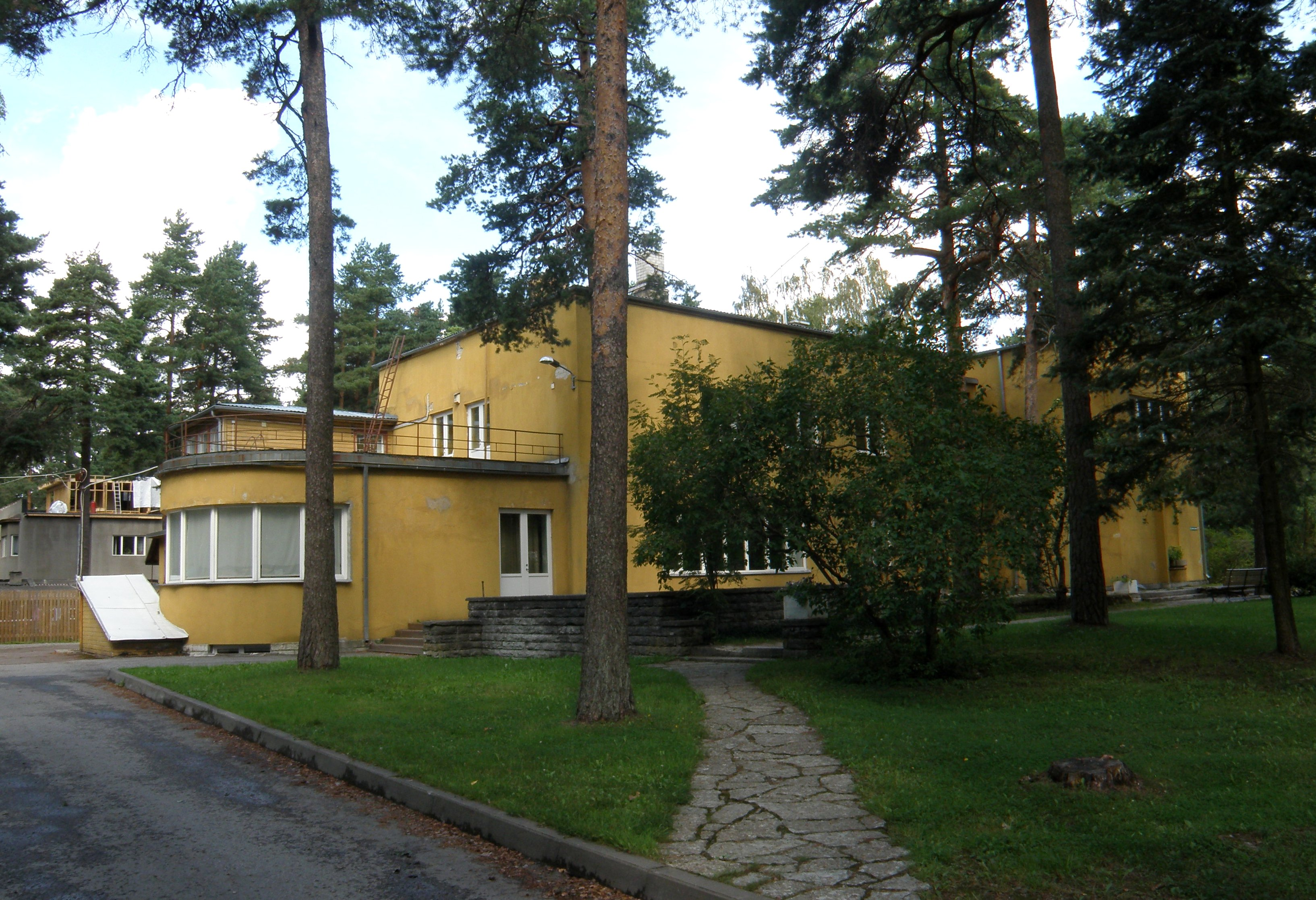
Villa nowadays.

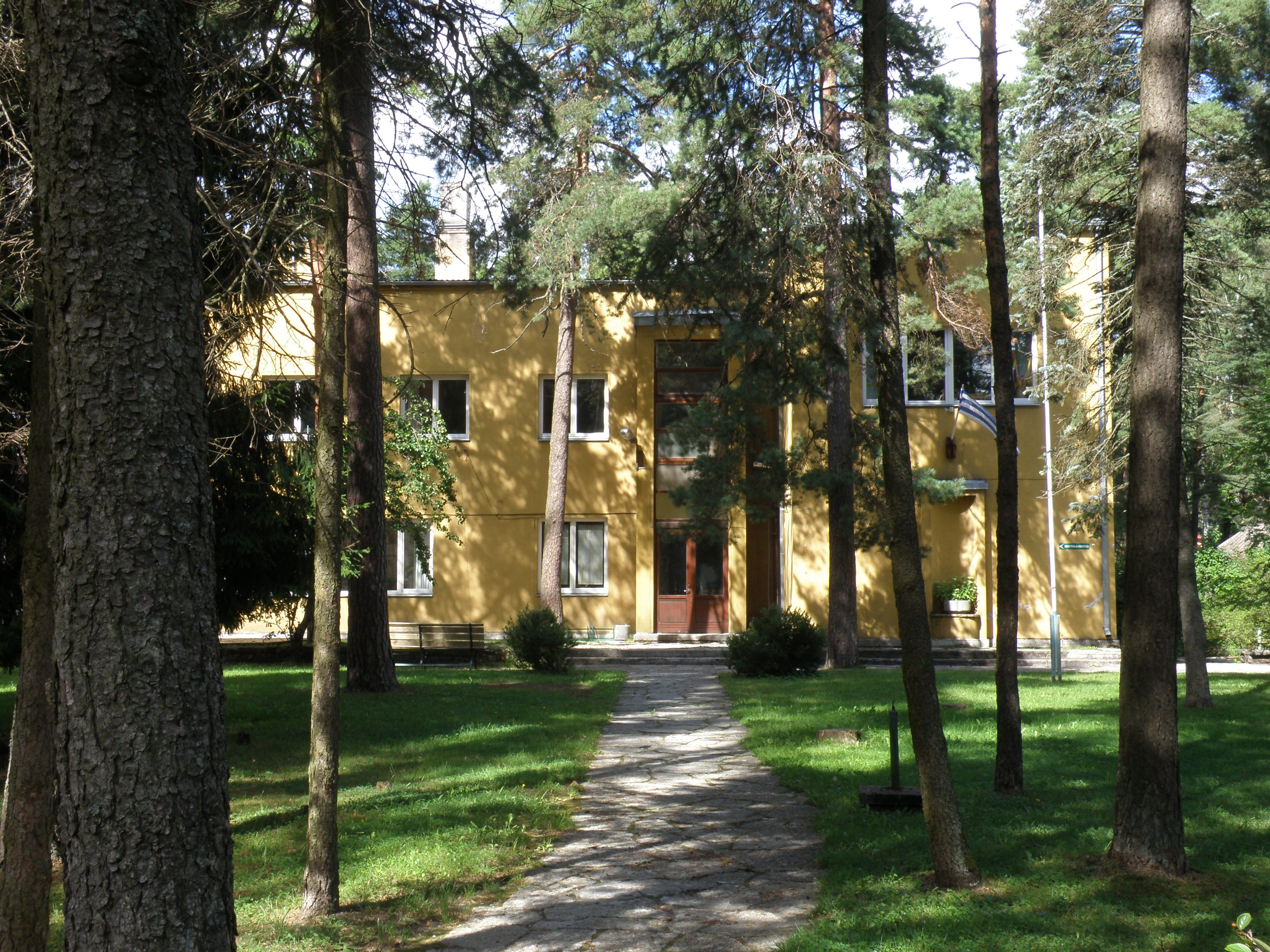

=== War Cemetery Memorial House-Mausoleum (1928) ===
1920-21 - in the years immediately after the War of Independence, the custody of the Defense Forces was organized. The Tallinn department first commissioned that the design of the cemetery should be done by architect Ernsy Ederberg, and then the Estonian Estates Commonwealth offered the architect Heerwagen to do the cemetery plan. Heerwagen's plan was extremely radical and planned to smooth down all the tombstones. To the organizers of the cemetery, this plan seemed too bold and the new plan was ordered from Edgar Kuusik. Kuusik, like Heerwagen, was based on modern cemetery designs. Tabernacles, flat ground and hedges were planned. Kuusik regrouped the road network, planted lawns and hedges and more than 800 graves.

Kuusik began the works in autumn 1927. The construction of the monument began in May 1928 and was completed by October, at the same year. The opening brochure (1928) lists the names of the actors: the figure of Alexander Jannes, the arch member Aav and three younger islands, the construction master Martin, the ten Seiman and Lasnamäe career stonewalker master Valk. The limestone mausoleum based on massive triangular groves from four corners was 8 meters high. The pillars, arches, the foot of the urn and reliefs were Saaremaa's so-called marble, the rest of Lasnamäe's lacing. The roof was covered with a patch, a ceiling made of pine wood. There were five reliefs on the front of the monument: the national coat of arms, on the two sides the four emblems that symbolized the infantry, navy, horse racing and cavalry. On the southern side there was a large coat of arms on Tallinn, on the eastern side a small coat of arms of Tallinn, and on the west side a letter: "1918-1920. year in the fall of the Estonian War of Independence. The Holy is compulsory for the fatherland - the sons of my homeland - you have a "peaceful ...". The cannon fountains gave ground floor air in the spring of 1950 to the "honor" of the 10th anniversary of the ENSV, so remembered by contemporary.

Other monuments of the cemetery

Kuusik also designed the War of Independence soldiers and General Johan Und (1933) and the monumental gates (1938). The first of them was as it has been restored to this day: in a modest aspect, Finnish granite is solid, with a geometric ornament at the top and a large round rhodium plain in the middle. Sculptor Rudolf The rhythmic relief depicts a hero struggling with two snakes and is surrounded by a capital letter: "For a Free Estonia to Death Trust." The relief was kept and returned to recovery. The restored monument was opened on 22 February 1998. Then, for the generals Johan Und and Ernst Põder, there were added nine tokens to the senior leaders of the War of Independence, from which a memorial to the 12 heroes was completed (completed in 2000). The gates of the cemetery inspired by the triumphal archaeological site were also a memorial building: on its inner sides there were the names of the mummies, some of which are nowadays read. The building was consecrated on 20 November 1938, and it was preserved through the Soviet era. It was visually lined up with a military canteen built right behind it, which has been demolished today.

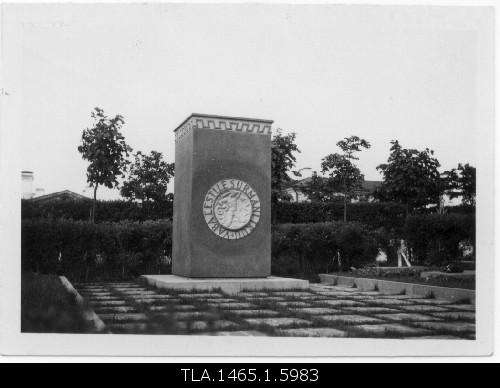
The monument for leaders.

== Unrealized projects ==
Tallinn Art Museum (1937 competition 1-st prize, shared with Erich Jacoby, the museum was not built), the Town Hall of Tallinn (1937, the purchase of the competition, which was chosen for execution, was not built). Moreover, E. J. Kuusik also participated in the Pärnu Rannahotell 1934-year competition where his project was given the II prize.
