= Andres Lipstok =

Estonian politician, chairman of the Bank of Estonia

Chairman of the Bank of Estonia
- In office 7 June 2005 – 7 June 2012

Vice President of the Estonian Olympic Committee
- In office 2004–2008

Member of the Riigikogu
- In office 1995–2005

Minister of Economic Affairs
- In office 1995–1996

Minister of Finance of the Republic of Estonia
- In office 1994–1995

Personal details
- Born: 6 February 1957 (age 69) Haapsalu
- Party: Eesti Reformierakond
- Education: University of Tartu

Andres Lipstok (born 6 February 1957 in Haapsalu) was the chairman of the Bank of Estonia from 7 June 2005 to 7 June 2012. He has been a member of the Eesti Reformierakond (Estonian Reform Party) since 1994 and also the Vice President of the Estonian Olympic Committee from 2004 to 2008.

== Career history ==
- 2005–2012 Chairman of the Bank of Estonia
- 2003–2005 Member of the X Riigikogu
- 1999–2003 Member of the IX Riigikogu
- 1995–1999 Member of the VIII Riigikogu
- 1995–1996 Minister of Economic Affairs of the Republic of Estonia
- 1994–1995 Minister of Finance of the Republic of Estonia
- 1989–1994 County Governor of Lääne County
- 1989 Deputy Minister of Finance of the Estonian SSR
- 1986–1989 Chairman of the Planning Commission of the executive committee of Haapsalu District
- 1983–1986 Head of the Finance Department of the executive committee of Haapsalu District
- 1980–1983 Deputy Head of the Finance Department of the executive committee of Haapsalu District

Political offices
Preceded by none	Governor of Lääne County; 1989–1994	Succeeded by Hannes Danilov
Preceded by Heiki Kranich	Minister of Finance; 1994–1995	Succeeded by Mart Opmann
Preceded by Liina Tõnisson	Minister of Economic Affairs; 1995–1996	Succeeded by Jaak Leimann
Preceded by Vahur Kraft	Chairman of the Bank of Estonia; 2005–2012	Succeeded by Ardo Hansson
