= Siim Kallas =

Estonian politician (1948–2026)

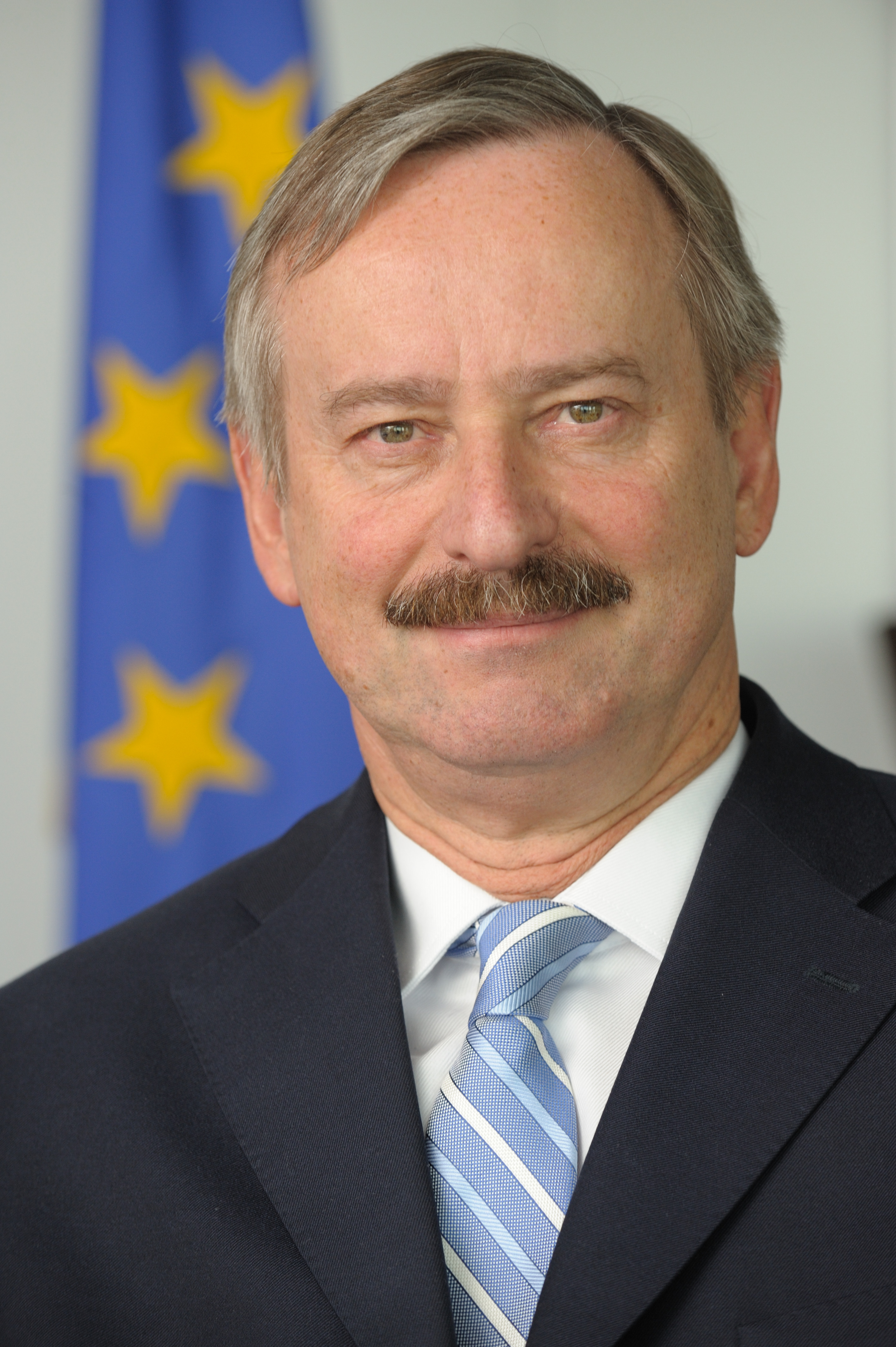
- Official portrait, 2010

European Commissioner for Transport
- In office 9 February 2010 – 1 November 2014
- President: José Manuel Barroso
- Preceded by: Antonio Tajani
- Succeeded by: Violeta Bulc

European Commissioner for Administrative Affairs, Audit and Anti-Fraud
- In office 22 November 2004 – 9 February 2010
- President: José Manuel Barroso
- Preceded by: Neil Kinnock (Administrative Reform)
- Succeeded by: Maroš Šefčovič (Inter-Institutional Relations and Administration); Algirdas Šemeta (Taxation and Customs Union, Audit and Anti-Fraud)

European Commissioner for Economic and Monetary Affairs
- In office 1 May 2004 – 22 November 2004; Served with Joaquín Almunia
- President: Romano Prodi
- Preceded by: Pedro Solbes
- Succeeded by: Joaquín Almunia

Prime Minister of Estonia
- In office 28 January 2002 – 10 April 2003
- President: Arnold Rüütel
- Preceded by: Mart Laar
- Succeeded by: Juhan Parts

Minister of Foreign Affairs
- In office 9 November 1995 – 21 November 1996
- Prime Minister: Tiit Vähi
- Preceded by: Riivo Sinijärv
- Succeeded by: Toomas Hendrik Ilves

Member of the Riigikogu
- In office 3 March 2019 – 7 September 2024

Personal details
- Born: 2 October 1948 Tallinn, then part of Estonian SSR, Soviet Union
- Died: 22 August 2026 (aged 77) Tallinn, Estonia
- Party: Reform (since 1994)
- Other political affiliations: Communist Party of the Soviet Union (until 1991)
- Spouse: Kristi Kallas
- Children: 2, including Kaja
- Relatives: Eduard Alver (grandfather)
- Education: University of Tartu
- Siim Kallas's voice Kallas announcing Estonia's intention to pursue European Union candidate status Recorded 4 December 1995

Siim Kallas (Note: Estonian pronunciation: [ˈsiːːm ˈkɑlːɑs]) (2 October 1948 – 22 August 2026) was an Estonian politician who served as Prime Minister of Estonia from 2002 to 2003 and as a European Commissioner from 2004 to 2014. His daughter, Kaja Kallas, was the prime minister of Estonia from 2021 to 2024.

== Political career ==
From 1972 to 1990 Kallas was a member of the Communist Party of the Soviet Union. He worked in the finance ministry of Estonian SSR and was the director of the Estonian branch of State Labor Savings Banks System in 1986–1989. In 1987, Kallas was one of the authors of the IME plan for self-managing Estonia with Tiit Made, Edgar Savisaar, and Mikk Titma. The plan proposed to make Estonia economically independent from the Soviet Union – adopting a market economy and establishing Estonia's own currency and tax system. Kallas was the chief editor of Rahva Hääl, the official newspaper of the Communist Party of Estonia, in 1989–1991. He was elected a member of the Congress of People's Deputies of the Soviet Union in the 1989 Soviet Union legislative election, the first partially free elections in the Soviet Union.

After Estonia restored its independence in 1991, Kallas was appointed the President of the Bank of Estonia, which at the time had only 11 employees. Within a year a coherent structure of the bank was set up and on 20 June 1992, Estonia's own currency, the kroon, was back in circulation for the first time since 1941.

Kallas entered politics in 1994 as one of the founders of liberal Estonian Reform Party, which was successful in the 1995 parliamentary elections. Kallas served as the minister of foreign affairs from 1995 to 1996. He later served as the minister of finance from 1999 to 2002 and the prime minister from 2002 to 2003.

He served as the European Commissioner for Transport between 2010 and 2014. Before that he was the European Commissioner for Administrative Affairs, Audit and Anti-Fraud between 2004 and 2009. In both Barroso Commissions he was also a Vice-President. He was twice appointed the Acting Commissioner for Economic and Monetary Affairs and the Euro in Olli Rehn's stead, from 19 April 2014 to 25 May 2014 while he was on electoral campaign leave for the 2014 elections to the European Parliament and from 1 July 2014 to 16 July 2014 after he took up his seat.

After leaving the European Commission, Kallas ran in the Estonian presidential election in 2016, but was not elected. In October 2017, he started as the municipal mayor of Viimsi Parish. In 2019 he was elected member of the Riigikogu, a post he was also elected to in 2023. He resigned as a member of Riigikogu and from politics in September 2024.

== Personal life and death ==
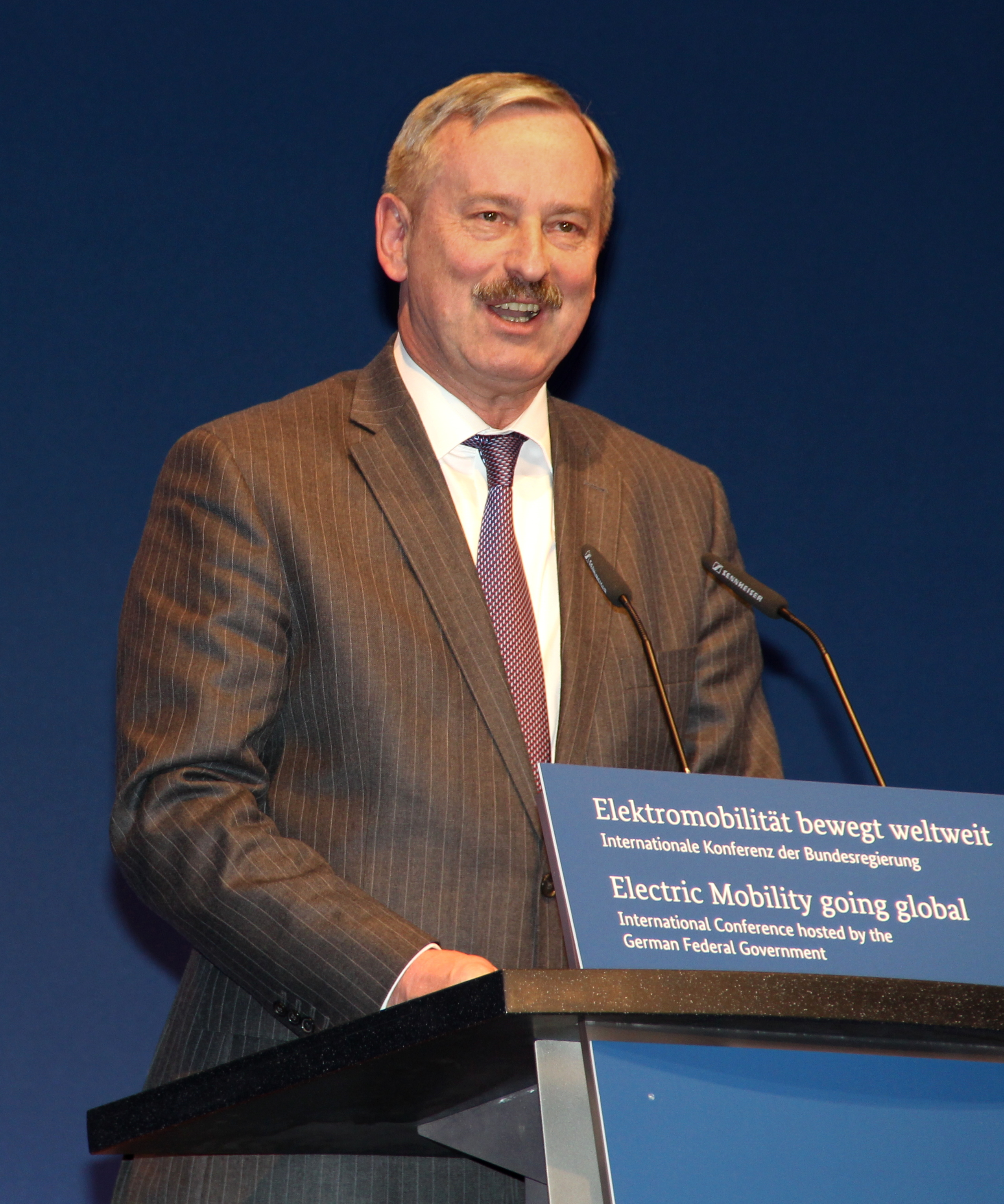
Siim Kallas at the electromobility summit 2013 in Berlin

Kallas' grandfather was Eduard Alver, one of the founders of the Republic of Estonia on 24 February 1918, and the Commander of the Estonian Defence League during the Estonian War of Independence, and the first chief of the Estonian Police from 1918 to 24 May 1919. He spoke Estonian, English, Russian, Finnish, and German. Kallas was of Estonian and distant Baltic German ancestry.

Kallas was married to doctor Kristi Kallas, who, during the Soviet deportations from Estonia, at age six months, was deported to Siberia with her mother and grandmother in a cattle car and lived there until she was 10 years old.

He had one son and one daughter. His daughter Kaja Kallas was the leader of the Reform party and the prime minister of Estonia from 2021 to 2024, after which she became EU Representative for Foreign Affairs.

Siim Kallas died in his sleep at home on 22 August 2026, at the age of 77.

Political offices
Preceded by Rein Otsason	Chairman of the Bank of Estonia; 1991–1995	Succeeded by Vahur Kraft
Preceded by Riivo Sinijärv	Minister of Foreign Affairs; 1995–1996	Succeeded by Toomas Hendrik Ilves
Preceded by Niels Helveg Petersen	Chairperson of the Committee of Ministers of the Council of Europe; 1996	Succeeded by Tarja Halonen
Preceded by Mart Opmann	Minister of Finance; 1999–2002	Succeeded by Harri Õunapuu
Preceded by Mart Laar	Prime Minister of Estonia; 2002–2003	Succeeded by Juhan Parts
New office	Estonian European Commissioner; 2004–2014	Succeeded by Andrus Ansip
Preceded by Pedro Solbes	European Commissioner for Economic and Monetary Affairs; 2004; Served alongside: Joaquín Almunia	Succeeded by Joaquín Almunia
Preceded by Neil Kinnock as European Commissioner for Administrative Reform	European Commissioner for Administrative Affairs, Audit and Anti-Fraud; 2004–2010	Succeeded by Maroš Šefčovič as European Commissioner for Inter-Institutional Relations and Administration
Preceded by Neil Kinnock as European Commissioner for Administrative Reform	European Commissioner for Administrative Affairs, Audit and Anti-Fraud; 2004–2010	Succeeded by Algirdas Šemeta as European Commissioner for Taxation and Customs Union, Audit and Anti-Fraud
Preceded by Antonio Tajani	European Commissioner for Transport; 2010–2014	Succeeded by Violeta Bulc
