= Anton Lembit Soans =

Estonian architect

- Born: September 17, 1885; Oranienbaum, Russia
- Died: November 26, 1966 (aged 81); Tallinn, Estonia
- Occupations: Architect, urban planner and lecturer

Anton Lembit Soans (September 17, 1885 Oranienbaum, Russia – November 26, 1966 Tallinn, Estonia) was an Estonian architect, urban planner and lecturer. He was one of the founding members of the Estonian Architects Union.

== Education and work experience ==
In 1905, he graduated from the Tallinn Peter’s School of Science (now Tallinn Secondary School of Science). In Estonia, it was not possible to study architecture or engineering, so Anton Soans got his professional education at the Riga Polytechnic Institute (now Riga Technical University) in 1905–1913. At the same time, several other well-known names studied architecture in Riga, such as Erich Jacoby and Karl Treumann-Tarvas, Herbert Johanson, Eugen Habermann, Ernest Kühnert (also graduates of Tallinn Secondary School of Science) and Edgar Johan Kuusik. This Riga group is considered to be the first generation of Estonian architects.

Due to the lack of architects, there was no corresponding organization in Estonia in the tsarist era. In 1921, 10 local architects, including Anton Soans, founded the Estonian Architects Association (now the Union of Estonian Architects).

Anton Soans had a very varied career. Specialist career began in St. Petersburg as a member of the Association of Apartment Buildings under the guide of Ernst Wierich, it was recommended to work with someone for a few years before becoming independent professional.

During World War I, he headed the construction of insurances and military buildings in Petrograd and in Tallinn.

- 1920–23 Tallinn Ministry of Agriculture
- 1923–28 Tallinn City Government Building Department
- 1928–32 Land Board
- 1933–36 National Mortgage Bank of Estonia
- 1936–40 Department of Construction, Department of Roads
- 1944–56 Architectural Design and Planning Center and senior architect "In the Estonian project"

Teacher active: 1924–34 at Tallinn Technical College, 1936–39 at the Tallinn Technical University and 1946-56 at the Estonian National Art Institute (now Estonian Academy of Arts).

== As a city planner before World War II ==
From 1923–28 he worked as a city architect at Tallinn City Architecture Department in the footsteps of Herbert Johanson. Soans' urban planning generally saw a lot of greenery, as the distribution of healthier lifestyles also increased the proportion of greenery in the city. Often this meant the creation of parks between the streets and the streets surrounded by trees. For example, the area between Narva and Tartu highways was completed under his supervision, including the plan of the Police Park, the plans for the area between Väike-Ameerikas, as well as Pärnu highway and the railway, which provided for several plantations A good example of a garden city is the construction of Aarde and Preesi streets in Pelgulinna (1927), using H. Johanson's four typical projects (1929). Harald Arman has said: "This was one of the first fully integrated garden towns with small apartments."

1927–1928. the project "Air, Water and the Sun", which was created by Anton Soans, Edgar Kuusik and Frans de Vries, was awarded 1st Prize at the competition organized by the Pirita Coastal Planning Program.

During 1927–28 Toompea hillside and the mound was restored, a pedestrian walkway was built, a stadium at the center of the park with a service building for schools in the center of the city. A quadrilateral fountain designed by Anton Soans was constructed on the pond's shore, near which was built a rock-garden.

In 1928 was awarded the 1st Prize at the Kadrioru Park Reconstruction Competition. In 1935 Pelguranna Park Design Project.

Anton Soans was able to implement the principles of planning town planning in a good manner, taking into account the historical development of urban architecture, and thus actively involved in urban planning in smaller cities, towns, factory settlements and residential areas. In 1923 Soans made the first plan of Haapsalu, which foresaw it as a new management and shopping center (not performed), a more densely populated main street of Karja, a fire fighting house, a sanatorium specially for the resort and Läänemaa Gymnasium. In the same year, he designed, together with architect A. Eichhenhorn, a Tartu Ropka-Bishop Garden private district. In addition, there was work in the recreation areas in Sindi (1929), Rannamõisa (1929), Otepää, Vasalemma and Taevaskoja (1932). In 1925 a new mine was constructed on the edge of Kohtla-Järve, according to Anton Soans' general plan small dwellings and schoolhouses were built, wooden barracks and low-rise apartment buildings as dispersed groups (Hädaküla) and officials' houses (Siidisuka). He also designed a network of landscapes for a large pond in Kohtla-Järve, Pioneer Street and Pavandu houses.

== As a city planner after World War II ==
Soans’ urban planning intensified after World War II. A detailed plan for Mõisaküla private area was created with E. Habermann (1947). Then the post-war planning plans for Viljandi (1950), Narva, Põltsamaa (1955) and Valga (1956). Revival of Pärnu as a formerly prestigious resort town, restoration of Tartu as a centre for education and science (1945 with Peeter Tarvase, 1948, 1954 with J. Fomini and H. Arman, 1959 corrected) and Tallinn's new general plan (with O. Keppe and H. Arman, Option I, 1946, Revised 1950, was approved in 1952; Soviet Estonia Prize in 1948). Post-war reconstruction of Tallinn took 20 years to achieve its development as a capital. The first 5–6 years were spent on restoration work, not many new buildings were built. In 1946, the renovation of the theatre and concert hall "Estonia" was begun and completed four years later. In 1947-48 the Lenin (now Rävala blvd) avenue and the Estonian Red Hut, later Theatre Square, was created. The main focus had been on the most devastated parts of the urban scape, in the city centre.

== As an architect ==
In terms of his output, Soans can be regarded mostly as a city planner, but he is the author of several architectural projects. He was ready to work with other architects, and all of Anton Soans's most famous houses were born out of collaboration.

Early in the 1920s Soans was a traditionalist, but the most successful architects of that style proved to be H. Johansson and E. Habermann. In the second half of the decade, he began to demonstrate his ability to execute functionalist architecture (A.Soans, House of the Estonian Seed Farm, Tallinn, Pärnu mnt 2, an overhaul project, 1923; Long 36. 1921, O. Moeler, A. Soans, 1924–25, G. Hellat). At that time, he was responsible for an individual project, a combined office and residential building (1928–29), on A. Adamson's 4th street.

Anton Soans was the planner of nos. 25-35 in Raua Street, its cul de sac segment. Started in 1932 and completed in 1936, it is one of the most unique projects in Estonia. Other participating architects for the buildings were Richard Falkenberg, Johann Ostrat, Villem Seidra and Artur Veedemaa-Vetemaa. Its form of geometric volumes is similar to the R. Mallet-Stevens' street in Paris, France. Soans' corner house had a shop, a lower roof terrace like the Le Corbusier roof gardens. In 2015 it turned into a real estate development project called Villa Soans, in which the house was renovated and 9 apartments created.

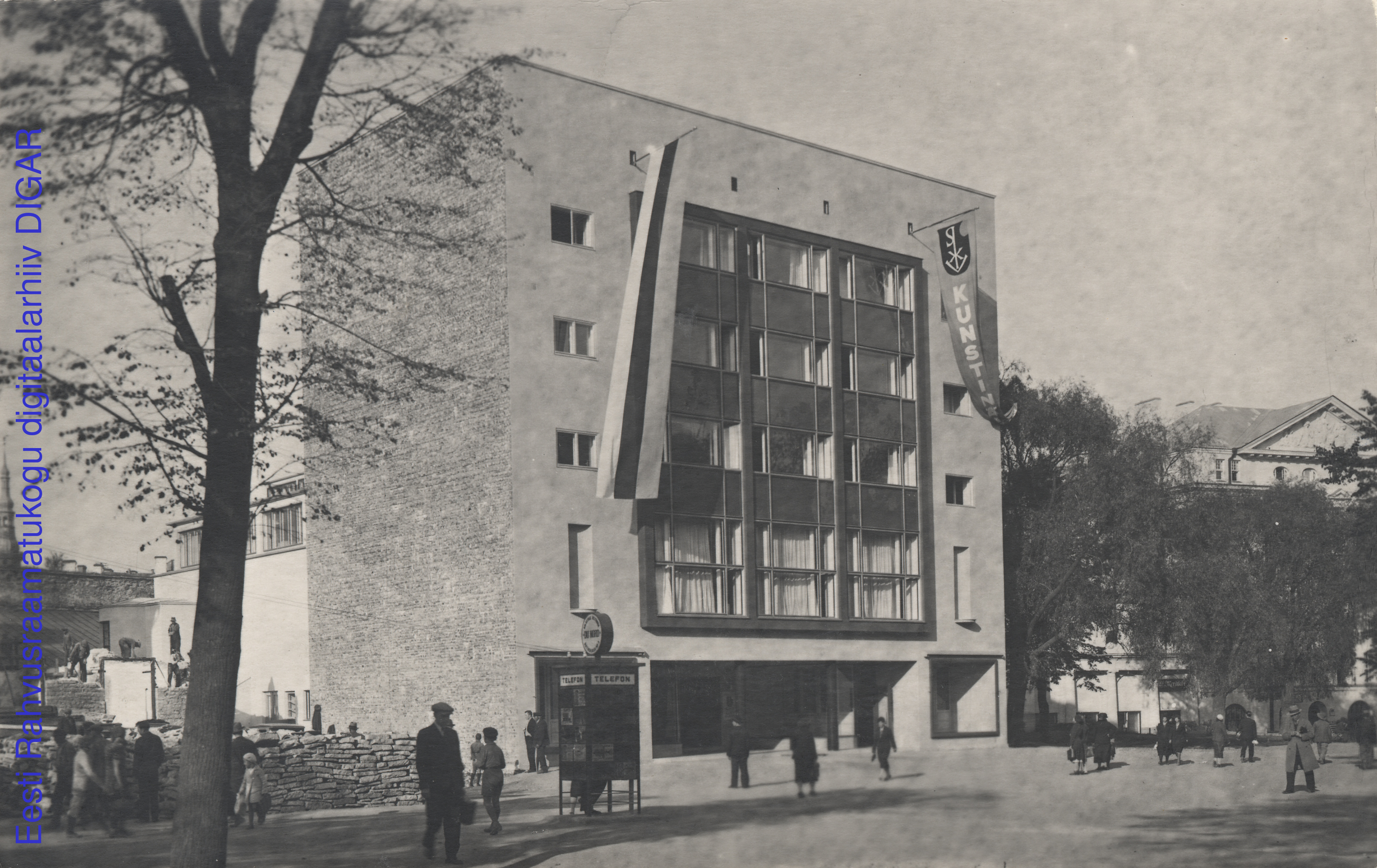
Tallinn Art Hall

In 1933, along with E. J. Kuusik, he designed the Tallinn Art Hall. This was a competition project, which was completed in 1934 with the financial support of Cultural Capital. A modernist aesthetic, featuring a large glass screen that combines exhibition halls, meeting rooms, and a number of studio windows. On the 1st floor of there was an Artists 'Club restaurant named, 'KuKu' with a commercial are. There were showrooms on the 2nd floor, offices on the third and, on the top floor were artists' studio apartments. Due to the lack of space, in 1963, Kuusik designed an extra floor on top. The facade and showrooms were restored in 1995. The divisions of the building remain unchanged.

That same year Soans designed an apartment building at Tõnismäe 16a, completed in 1936

As did Kuusik, Soans collaborated with the Pärnu city architect, Olev Siinmaa. Soans' creative contribution is uncertain, but he signed both the Pärnu Beach Hotel (1935–1937) and the functionalist villa on Lõuna street (1933–1936).

In 1936 the annex of the 19th-century wooden building of Koidula 32b was completed. The house has robustly functionalistic elements, asymmetrical corner window frames, a round panorama wall and metal railings on balconies. It was his own individual project.

The Võru Bank building began to rise on the corner of Tartu and Jüri Street in 1937 and was completed in 1939. It was again a collaboration with Kuusik. The building was classically structured - in a small town on the main square, three-stories, high-rise roof with a central two-floor main hall, very dominant in the city. In the style of president Päts, it had elements of traditionalism, a modern house with a variety of decorations on the facade. The facade also included iconic marble reliefs by sculptor Alexander Kaasik.

At the end of 1937, the Bank of Estonia announced the Pärnu bank house competition. In collaboration with Alar Kotl, Soans designed the winning project. The building was started in 1939, aiming for completion during the same year, but construction was delayed by the Second World War. It was finished in 1943. It was the largest structure in Pärnu and one of the largest bank buildings in Estonia at that time. Reconstruction and style will inevitably be similar in appearance to the same agency, perhaps even more decorative. Today it is the headquarters of SEB Pärnu.

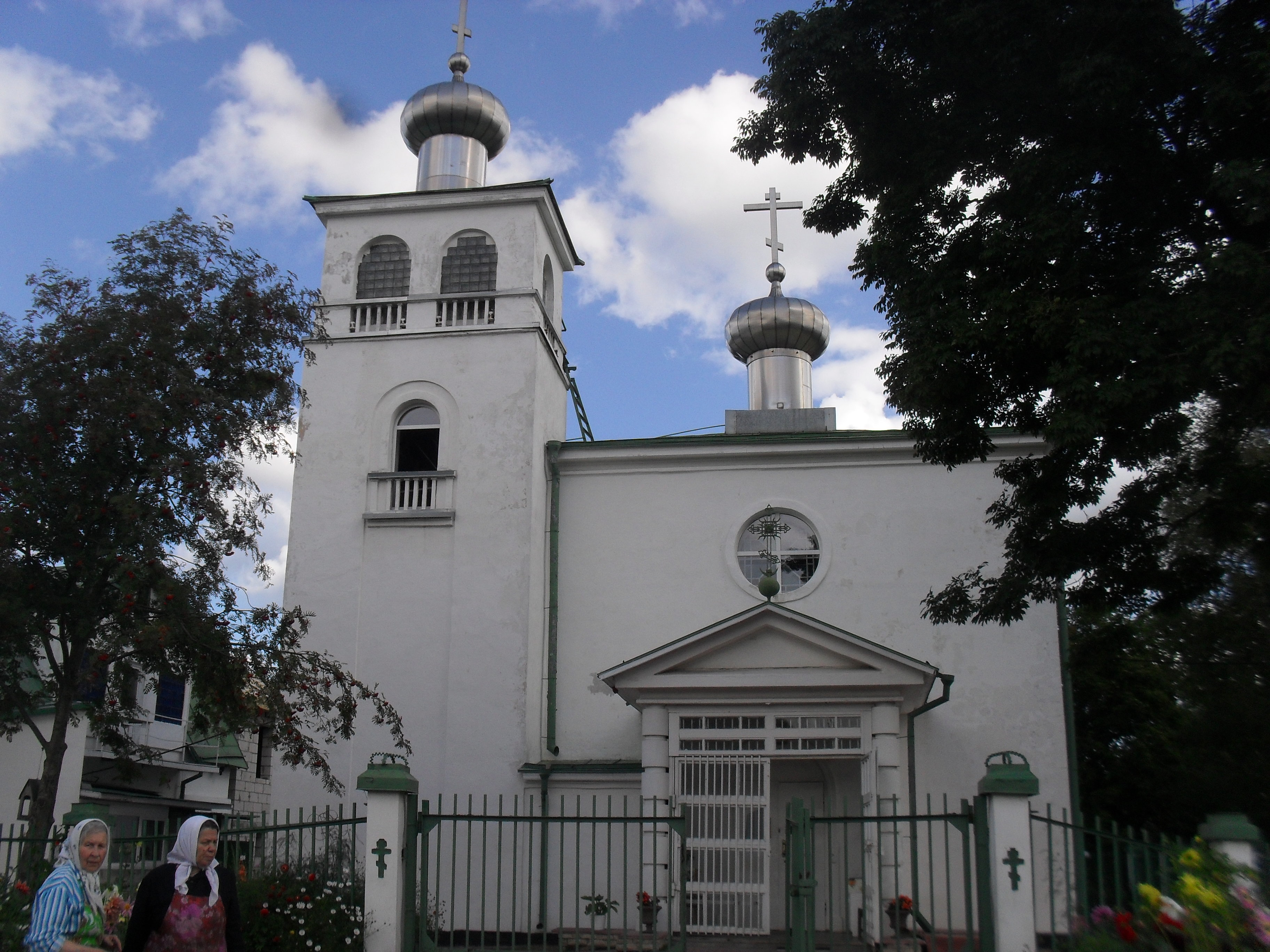
Kohtla-Järve Orthodox Church, photo 2012

In 1938, Anton Soans designed a Russian Orthodox Church in Kohtla-Järve, Järveküla tee 7. Geometrically clear and modest from the main plan. It was the only Orthodox church built in Estonia during that decade. Despite the traditional details, the structure and form of the church are quite modern, it did not even have the onion towers. In 1998 it was added to the register of cultural monuments, after a dome had been added to the church.

Soans has also tried his hand at designing memorials and one of the notable examples is a 1939 memorial pillar in Tahkuranna. Designed in collaboration with the sculptor Ferdi Sannamees, to mark the birthplace of Konstantin Päts.

He also designed the Pelgulinna Resort (destroyed in 1936), the Estonian Seedlings Community House (Valli St 1936), the Industrial Palace (1937 A. Kotli), the Fairs Building (1937) and the English College ( with J Kunder and A Jansen, 37–38, all in Tallinn, but not built) and the Pühajärve Holiday Home (only the administrative building was built in 1954).

== List of creations ==
- Haapsalu I Planning Scheme (1923)
- Tartu Ropka-Bishop garden city with A. Eichhenhorn (1923)
- Buildings of Aarde and Preesi Street in Pelgulinna with E. Habermann (1927)
- Merivälja garden city, 1st Place (1927).
- Pirita coastal planning plan with E.J Kuusik, 1st place (1927–28)
- Toompea park renewing (1927–28)
- Kadriorg Park transformation, 1st Place (1928)
- A. Adamson's 4 office and apartment building (1928–29)
- Sindi holiday village (1929)
- Rannamõisa recreation area (1929)
- Estonian Mortgage Bank with Karl Burman sen, II place (1930)
- Roosikrantsi 4b garden plan (1931)
- Vihula Elementary School with Karl Burman, Soans possibly only the signer (1931–32)
- Taevaskoja Holiday Village (1932)
- Villa in Pärnu, Lõuna 2a with O. Siinmaa, Soans possibly only the signer (1933)
- Estonian Art Museum with E. J. Kuusik, III place (1933)
- Tallinn Art Hall with E. J. Kuusik (1933–34)
- The Raua dead-end street: Raua 25 (1932) and 31 (1934)
- Pärnu Beach Hotel with Olev Siinmaa (1935)
- Pelgulinna beach (1935), destroyed
- Restoring and extension of Koidula 32b private house (1936)
- Tõnismäe 16a apartment building (1936)
- The building of the Estonian Seedlings Common House at Valli and Pärnu St corner (1936), not performed
- Fair House (1937)
- The industrial palace with A. Kotl in the corner of Roosikrantsi and Kaarli Blvd, 2 variants (1937), not performed
- Bank of Estonia Võru building with E.J Kuusik (1937–39)
- Bank of Estonia Pärnu building with A. Kotli (1937–43)
- English College next to Politseiaed park (1937–38)
- Järvakandi Elementary School (1938)
- Kohtla-Järve Workers' Union:
  - Pioneer and Pavandu St buildings (1922–23)
  - Buildings and park plan of the Siidisuka St with E. Habermann (1923–24)
  - Kohtla-Järve elementary school Spordi 2 (1938–39)
  - Järveküla 7 (1938), Russian Orthodox Church of the Transfiguration of the Lord
- Konstantin Päts Birthplace Memorial with Ferdin Sannameh (1939)
- Tallinn's new city plan with O. Keppe and H. Arman (1946–52):
- Lenin blvd (Rävala blvd) and Estonian Red Hoods Center (Theater Square) (1947–48)
- Planning of the Mõisaküla residential area with E. Habermann (1947)
- The post-war reconstruction of Tartu with Peeter Tarvase and H. Arman (1945–59)
- Post-war reconstruction of Pärnu and Narva
- Post-war reconstruction of Põltsamaa (1950)
- Holiday House in Pühajärve (only the administrative building headquarters was completed in 1954).
- Post-war reconstruction of Valga (1956)

== Personal exhibition ==
September 18, 2012 – November 7, 2010 the exhibition "Architect Anton Soans 125" took place in the salt basement big hall of the Estonian Architecture Museum, in which the curator was Matis Rodin and designer Marge Pervik-Kaal. The main part of the exhibition material came from the Soans personal fund at the Architecture Museum. [18]

== Personal life ==
His parents were Hans Soans and Amalie Rosalie Soans.

Married in 1930 Ellen Bachman, who worked as an accountant. They had two sons Eerik and Ado Soans, the first is a forest scientist and the younger one a civil engineer in civilian and industrial construction. His nephew was an artist Olev Soans, his brother's grandson is sculptor Jaak Soans.
