= RIGIBOR =

Reference interest rate in Latvia

The Riga Interbank Offered Rate (RIGIBOR) is a daily reference rate based on the interest rates at which banks offer to lend unsecured funds to other banks in the Latvia wholesale money market (or interbank market). RIGIBOR is published daily by the National Bank of Latvia together with RIGIBID (Riga Interbank Bid Rate).

== See also ==
- Euribor
- TALIBOR
