= Rein Otsason =

Estonian banker (1931–2004)

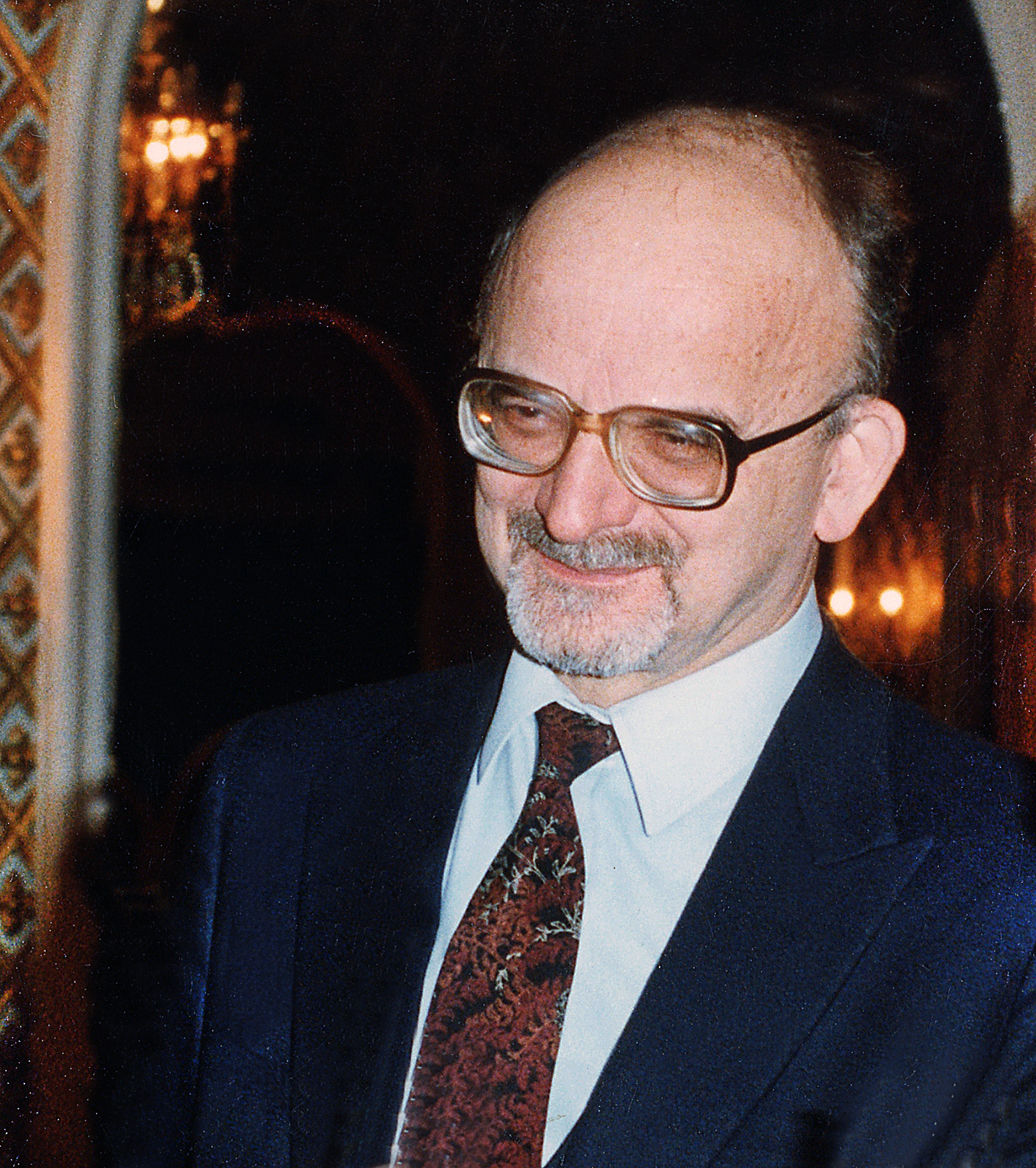
Otsason in 1993

Rein Otsason (24 May 1931 – 30 October 2004) was an Estonian banker.

== Biography ==
Otsason was born on 24 May 1931, in Tartu. After obtaining secondary education he came to study in Tallinn and graduated in 1954 from Tallinn Polytechnical Institute as an economist. He became one of the leading researchers on economics, being finally nominated as the Director of the Institute of Economics at the Estonian Academy of Sciences. Otsason completed a Doctorate in Economics in 1984.

From 1988 to 1989, he worked as the Head of the State Plan Committee of the Estonian SSR. Those years were the beginning of Estonia breaking away from the Soviet system. On 15 December 1989, the Estonian government decided to establish the Bank of Estonia (Eesti Pank). On 28 December 1989, the Bank Law of the Republic of Estonia was passed and Otsason was appointed the first President of the Bank of Estonia. On 1 January 1990, the Bank of Estonia began its work as independent bank of issue.

=== Bank of Estonia ===
Otsason led the Bank of Estonia in its very first years when legal acts regulating the activities of the bank were created and monetary reform to re-establish Estonian kroon as the national currency of Estonia was prepared. On 15 March 1990, the Statutes of the Bank of Estonia were approved; on 15 May 1990 the procedure for establishment of commercial banks was established. The programmes for transition to national currency were finished in November 1990 and the next year started the preparations for monetary reform.

Otsason participated in the work of Monetary Reform Committee established on 27 March 1991 and led by Prime Minister Edgar Savisaar. He signed on 10 May 1991 a contract with the company Thomas De La Rue & Co Ltd. for printing banknotes of Estonian kroons. Although his work was crucial for the success of monetary reform, he was not the one to supervise the reform. His wish to postpone the monetary reform until a way would be found to alleviate social problems caused by the reform led to confrontation with his superiors and on 23 September 1991 he was replaced with Siim Kallas. The reform took place on 20 June 1992.

Otsason and Siim Kallas are often called the "fathers of Estonian kroon". Otsason was decorated by the President of the Republic with the Estonian Order of the Coat of Arms, 4th class (2003).

=== Estonian Credit Bank ===
Otsason started to work on creating his own bank. The commercial bank known as Estonian Credit Bank (Eesti Krediidipank) was established on 15 March 1992. Otsason was the leader of the bank from its establishment till his death, first as the Chairman of the Board and post 2000 as the chairman of the council. He and his wife Valentina Otsason were also the main shareholders of the Estonian Credit Bank. Using his extensive knowledge and connections, he managed to maintain the bank even during the 1998 Russian financial crisis, when numerous small financial institutions went bankrupt.

As the President of the Estonian Credit Bank, he was also a board member of the Estonian Banking Association (Eesti Pangaliit).

In 2003, Otsason started co-operation with the Bank of Moscow, which obtained 18.69% of the shares of the Estonian Credit Bank through its subsidiary company Latvian Business Bank. After Otsason's death, on 20 October 2004, in Tallinn, the Latvian Business Bank became a major shareholder of the Estonian Credit Bank, obtaining 60% of shares on 2 August 2005.

=== Politics ===
Otsason was a member of the Union for the Republic - Res Publica and was a candidate at the 2003 Estonian parliamentary election. He was elected to the Estonian Parliament (Riigikogu), but turned down his seat and decided to continue his work in the bank.

== Career ==
- 1980–1984 First Secretary, Soviet embassy, Budapest, Hungary
- 1984–1988 Director of the Institute of Economics at the Estonian Academy of Sciences
- 1988–1989 Head of the Estonian State Plan Committee
- 1989–1991 President of the Bank of Estonia
- 1992–2004 President of the Estonian Credit Bank
- 1992–2000 Chairman of the Board of the Estonian Credit Bank
- 2000–2004 Chairman of the Council of the Estonian Credit Bank

== See also ==
- Bank of Estonia
- Estonian kroon

Preceded by Oskar Kerson (in exile)	Chairman of the Bank of Estonia; 1989–1991	Succeeded by Siim Kallas
