= Bank of Estonia =

Central bank of Estonia

Bank of Estonia Eesti Pank

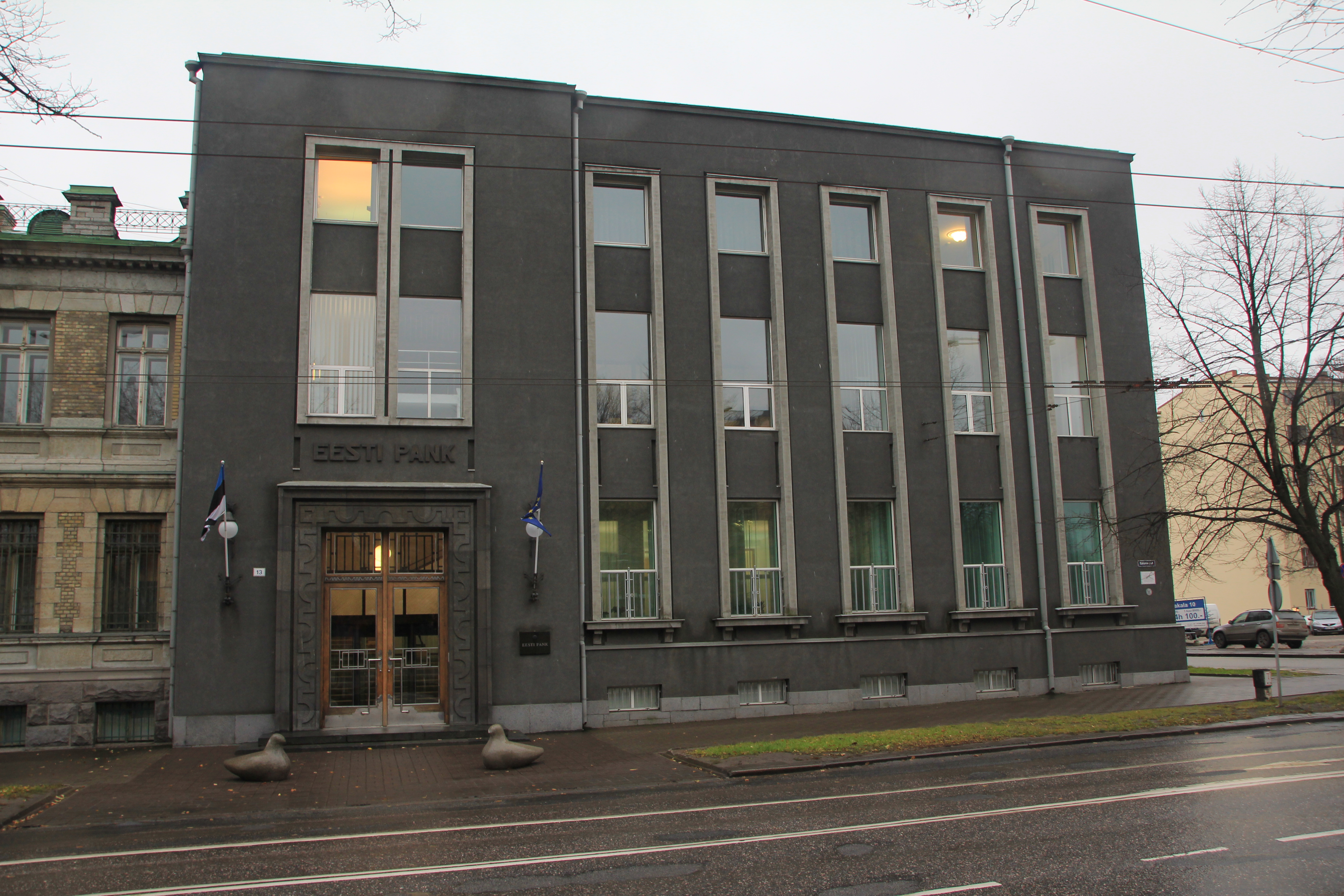
- Head office at Estonia puiestee 13 in Tallinn, erected 1935 on a design by architects Eugen Habermann and Herbert Johanson
- Central bank of: Estonia
- Headquarters: Tallinn
- Coordinates: 59.432778°N 24.749167°E
- Established: 24 February 1919; 107 years ago
- Ownership: 100% state ownership
- Governor: Ülo Kaasik
- Reserves: 300 million USD
- Succeeded by: European Central Bank (2011)^{1}
- Website: www.eestipank.ee
- ^{1} The Bank of Estonia still exists but many functions have been taken over by the ECB.

The Bank of Estonia (Estonian: Eesti Pank) is the national central bank for Estonia within the Eurosystem. It was the Estonian central bank from 1919 to 2010 (albeit with a long suspension between 1940 and 1989), issuing the kroon.

The Bank of Estonia is not itself a financial supervisory authority but participates in European banking supervision as a member of the Supervisory Board of the European Central Bank, alongside the Financial Supervisory Authority. It is also a member of the European Systemic Risk Board (ESRB).

== Name ==
Like other central banks, the Bank of Estonia refers to itself in its native language even in English-speaking contexts.

== History ==
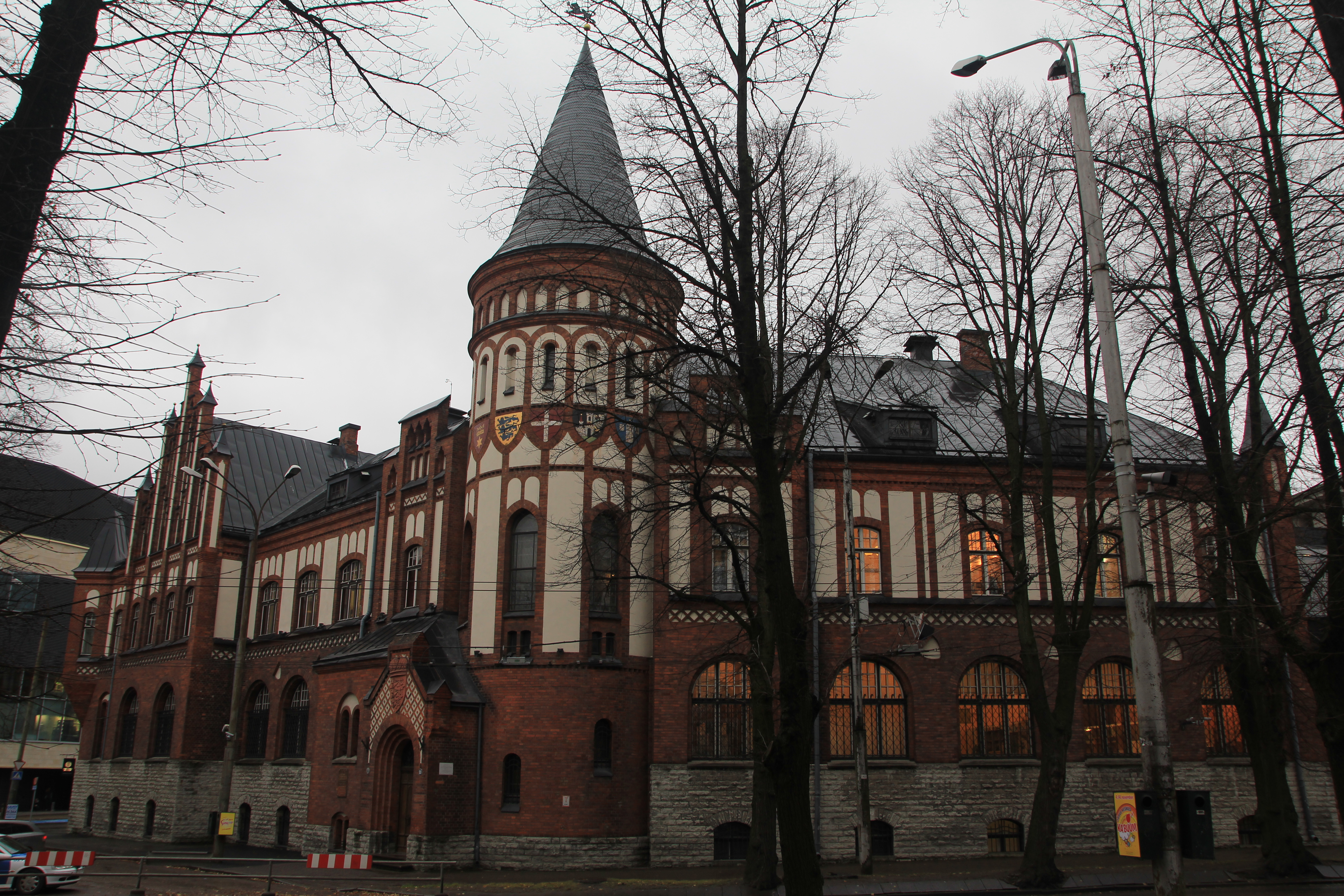
Former building of the Bank of the Credit Society of the Estonian Knighthood at Estonia puiestee 11 in Tallinn, now home of the Museum of the Bank of Estonia

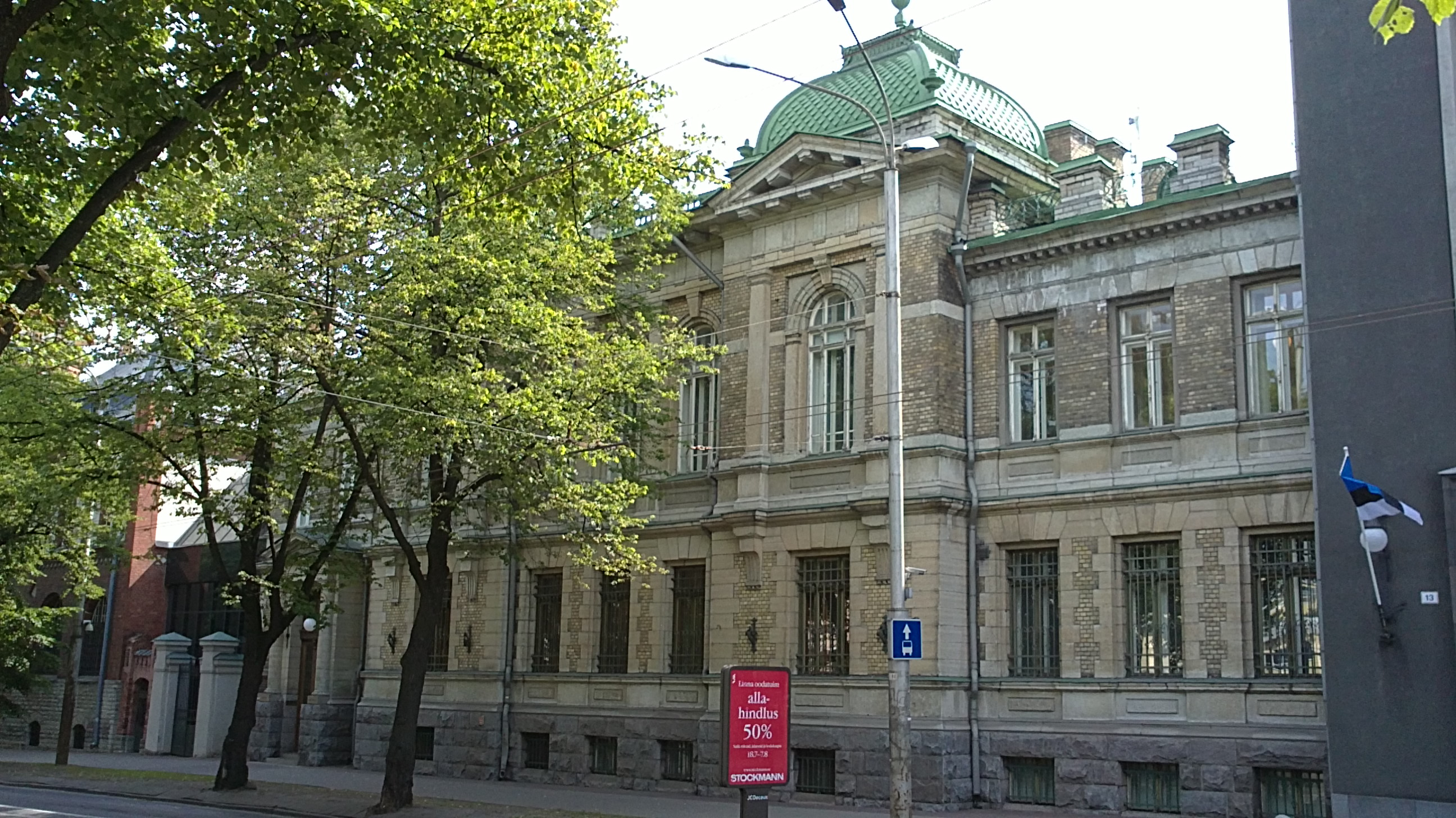
Former building of the State Bank of the Russian Empire at Estonia puiestee 13, now part of the Bank of Estonia head office complex; site of the Estonian Declaration of Independence

=== Interwar period ===
The bank was established on 24 February 1919 by the provisional government of Estonia following the independence of Estonia. In 1921, Eesti Pank was made the national bank and given the duty of printing the Estonian mark.

The Bank of Estonia was restructured under the conditions of the stabilization loan coordinated by the Economic and Financial Organization of the League of Nations. A new version of the Statutes was approved in 1927, according to which Eesti Pank became an independent note-issuing central bank with limited functions. The main tasks of the bank remained to guarantee the value of the money through currency circulation and through the arrangement and regulation of short-term credit volume. Through the sale of government securities, the bank became a true joint-stock bank.

A foreign loan of GBP1.35 million (27.6 million kroon) supplemented the foreign currency reserves, of which Eesti Pank received GBP 1 million. The gold and foreign currency reserves of the State Treasury were also transferred to the central bank. The fixed capital of the bank was increased from 2.5 million kroon to 5 million kroon. The sizes of the issues in relation to the reserves backing the kroon were determined. Long-term loans that had become illiquid were transferred to the Long Term Loan Bank, founded specifically for the purpose of releasing Eesti Pank from this burden.

Upon the Soviet invasion of 1940, the Bank of Estonia was closed by the occupying authorities. Its operations were taken over by the State Bank of the Soviet Union, which introduced the Soviet ruble as legal tender.

=== Reestablishment and aftermath ===
The Bank of Estonia was re-established on 1 January 1990, following Soviet legislation of November 1989 that granted the Baltic Republics a degree of policy autonomy. The new institution, however, could not act as a central bank since Estonia was still part of the ruble zone and the State Bank of the USSR kept its branch in Tallinn. It developed an autonomous capacity for policy expertise and also a commercial business of its own by taking over the Estonian operations of Vnesheconombank which gave it experience in managing foreign assets. That embryonic Bank of Estonia also attempted to take other steps within its ability for the liberalisation of the economy and in order to make the transition to a market economy: it began organising currency auctions, publishing quotations of the number of rubles in circulation, and issuing licenses for foreign payments and settlements. It also attempted to regulate the fledgling Estonian banking sector. Settlements were still performed through Moscow, however, the local clearing centre being still part of the Soviet State Bank infrastructure. When Estonian independence was restored in August 1991, the Bank of Estonia only had about 25 staff.

Following independence, the Bank of Estonia finally took over the former Soviet State Bank branch and was acknowledged as the legal successor of the interwar central bank of the Republic of Estonia. In April 1992, following a visit by economist Jeffrey Sachs in Tallinn early in that month, the Bank of Estonia decided to implement a currency board arrangement so as to provide monetary stability and to deflect the risk of political interference. This radical decision allowed the Bank to promptly introduce the country's new currency, the kroon pegged at eight to the Deutsche Mark, on 20 June 1992.

The Bank of Estonia's initial foreign exchange reserves was made predominantly of its interwar predecessor's gold reserves that had been immobilized for more than half a century. The Bank of England thus returned about $52 million in gold in early 1992, followed by the Bank for International Settlements with $45 million in July 1992. These were sufficient to appropriately cover the Bank's liabilities plus the full value of deposits at the state-owned Eesti Hoiupank. Reserve areas of the State Forest Fund worth 150 million dollars had also been transferred to the Bank of Estonia in January 1992, even though they had more of a moral and emotional value for the Estonian public than practical usefulness as foreign exchange reserves; they were removed from the Bank's balance sheet in June 1997.

The new "second kroon" banknotes reached Estonia in April 1992. Within three days of their introduction to the public on 20 June 1992, 1500 rubles were exchanged to krooni for each resident natural person at the rate of 1 kroon = 10 rubles. Almost the entire amount of rubles in circulation in Estonia was exchanged. The rate was considered under-priced by many opponents, but it actually corresponded to the market rate of that time.

Later in 1992, the Bank of Estonia led the resolution of a major banking crisis triggered by the fact that several Estonian banks, including Balti Ühispank, Põhja-Eesti Aktsiapank (PEAP), and Tartu Commercial Bank lost access to assets in Russia. Despite the facts that the three institutions together represented a significant share of Estonia's monetary system, the episode did not take a large toll on the Estonian economy.

Prior to the introduction of the euro, TALIBOR (the TALlinn Inter-Bank Offered Rate) was a daily reference rate based on the interest rates at which banks offer to lend unsecured funds to other banks in the Estonian wholesale money market (or interbank market in Estonian kroons). TALIBOR was published daily by the Bank of Estonia, together with TALIBID (Tallinn Interbank Bid Rate). TALIBOR was calculated based on the quotes for different maturities provided by reference banks at about 11.00 am each business day by disregarding highest and lowest quotation and calculating arithmetic mean of the quotations.

=== Adoption of the euro ===
With the introduction of the euro on 1 January 2011, the Bank of Estonia became a member of the Eurosystem or the system of Eurozone central banks that of that collectively set and implement the zone's monetary policy. Some of the functions of the bank were taken over by the European Central Bank. Other functions, as well as membership to the European System of Central Banks remained.

== Chairs and Governors ==
- Mihkel Pung (March 1919 – August 1919)
- Eduard Aule (October 1921 – October 1925)
- Artur Uibopuu (October 1925 – November 1926)
- Jüri Jaakson (November 1926 – July 1940)
- Juhan Vaabel (July 1940 – October 1940; ?)
- Martin Köstner (1944–1949; in exile)
- Oskar Kerson (21 January 1968 – 31 December 1980; in exile)
- Rein Otsason (1 January 1990 – 23 September 1991)
- Siim Kallas (23 September 1991 – 27 April 1995)
- Vahur Kraft (27 April 1995 – 7 June 2005)
- Andres Lipstok (7 June 2005 – 7 June 2012)
- Ardo Hansson (7 June 2012 – 7 June 2019)
- Madis Müller (7 June 2019 – 7 June 2026))
- Ülo Kaasik (majandustegelane) (Since 7 June 2026)

== See also ==
- Euribor
- RIGIBOR
- Estonian kroon
- Estonian mark
- Economy of Estonia
- List of central banks
