= Valgjärve =

Village in Estonia

Coordinates: 58°05′N 26°39′E

- Village
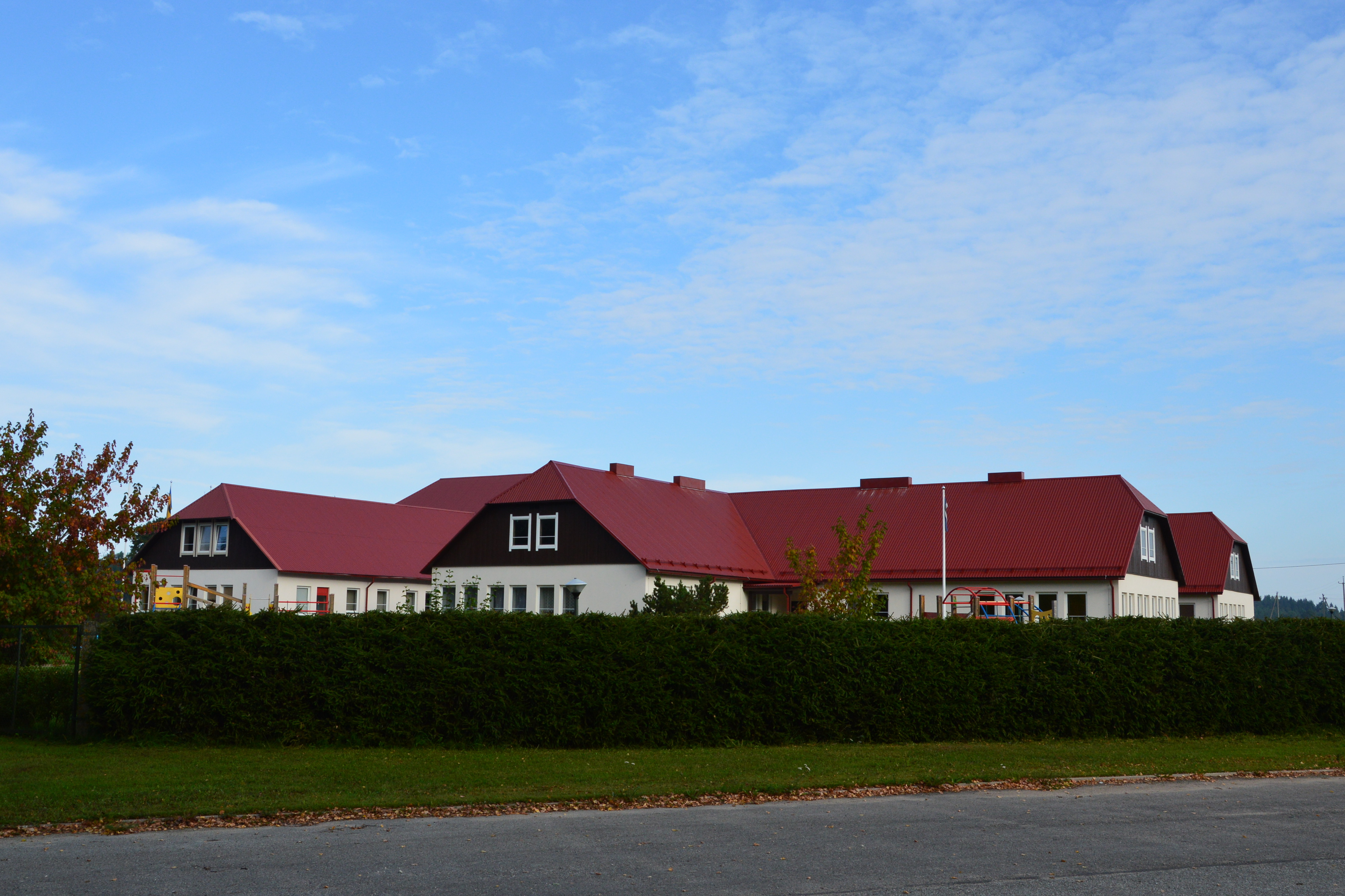
- Interactive map of Valgjärve
- Country: Estonia
- County: Põlva
- Parish: Kanepi
- Time zone: UTC+2 (EET)
  - Summer (DST): UTC+3 (EEST)

Valgjärve is a village in Kanepi Parish, Põlva County in southeastern Estonia.
