= Jaak Leimann =

Estonian economist and politician

Jaak Leimann (born 1 March 1941 in Võru) is an Estonian economist and politician.

From 1990 to 1992 and 1996 to 1999, he was Minister of Economic Affairs.
