= Vahur Kraft =

Estonian banker (born 1961)

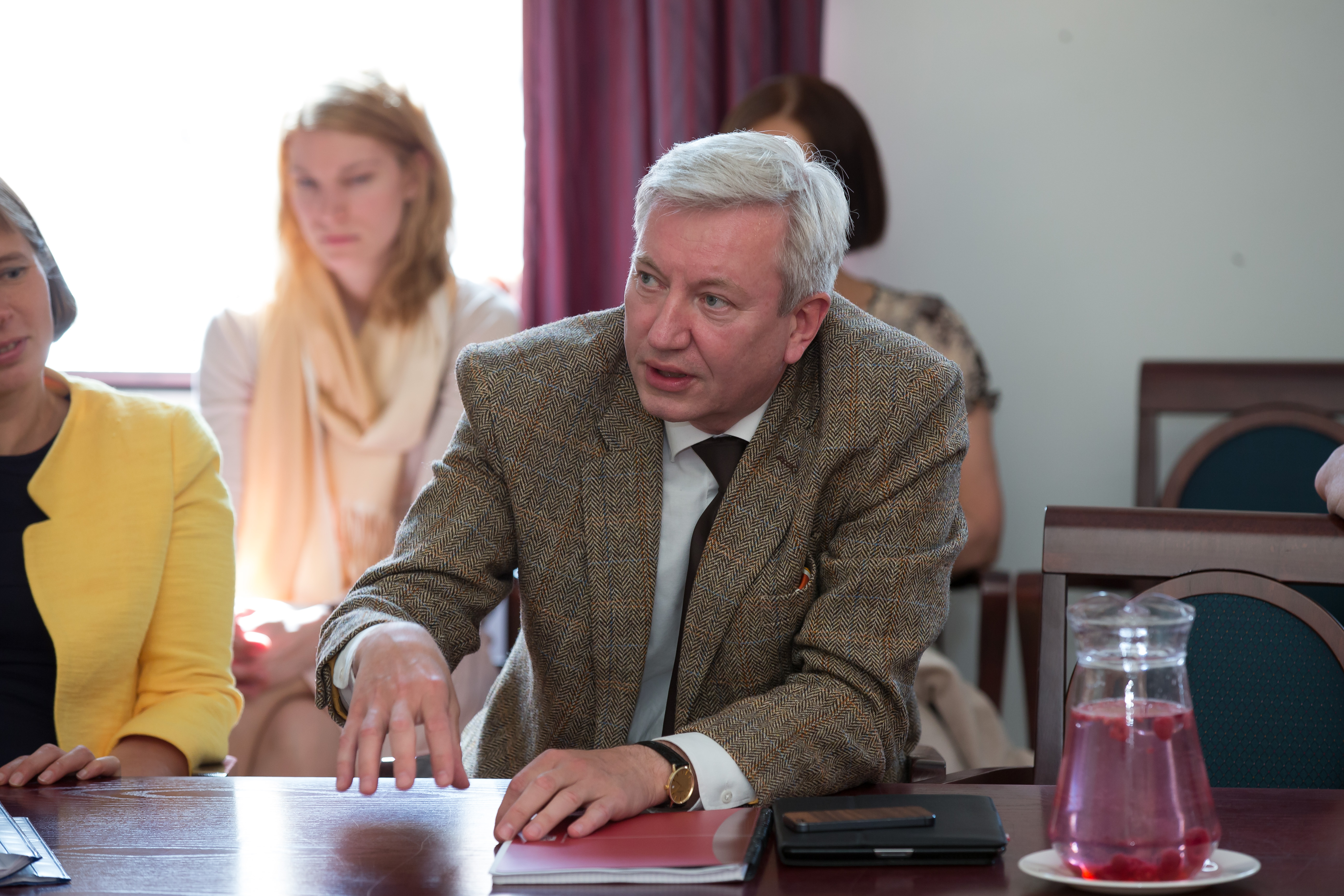

Chairman of the Bank of Estonia
- In office 1995–2005

Honorary Consul to Luxembourg in Estonia
- In office 2009–2013

Personal details
- Born: 11 March 1961 (age 65) Tartu

Vahur Kraft (born 11 March 1961 in Tartu) is an Estonian banker.

In 1984, he graduated from Tartu State University's faculty of economy.

From 1995 to 2005, he was the chairman of the Bank of Estonia. From 2009 to 2013, he was the Honorary Consul to Luxembourg in Estonia.
