= Herbert Johanson =

Estonian architect

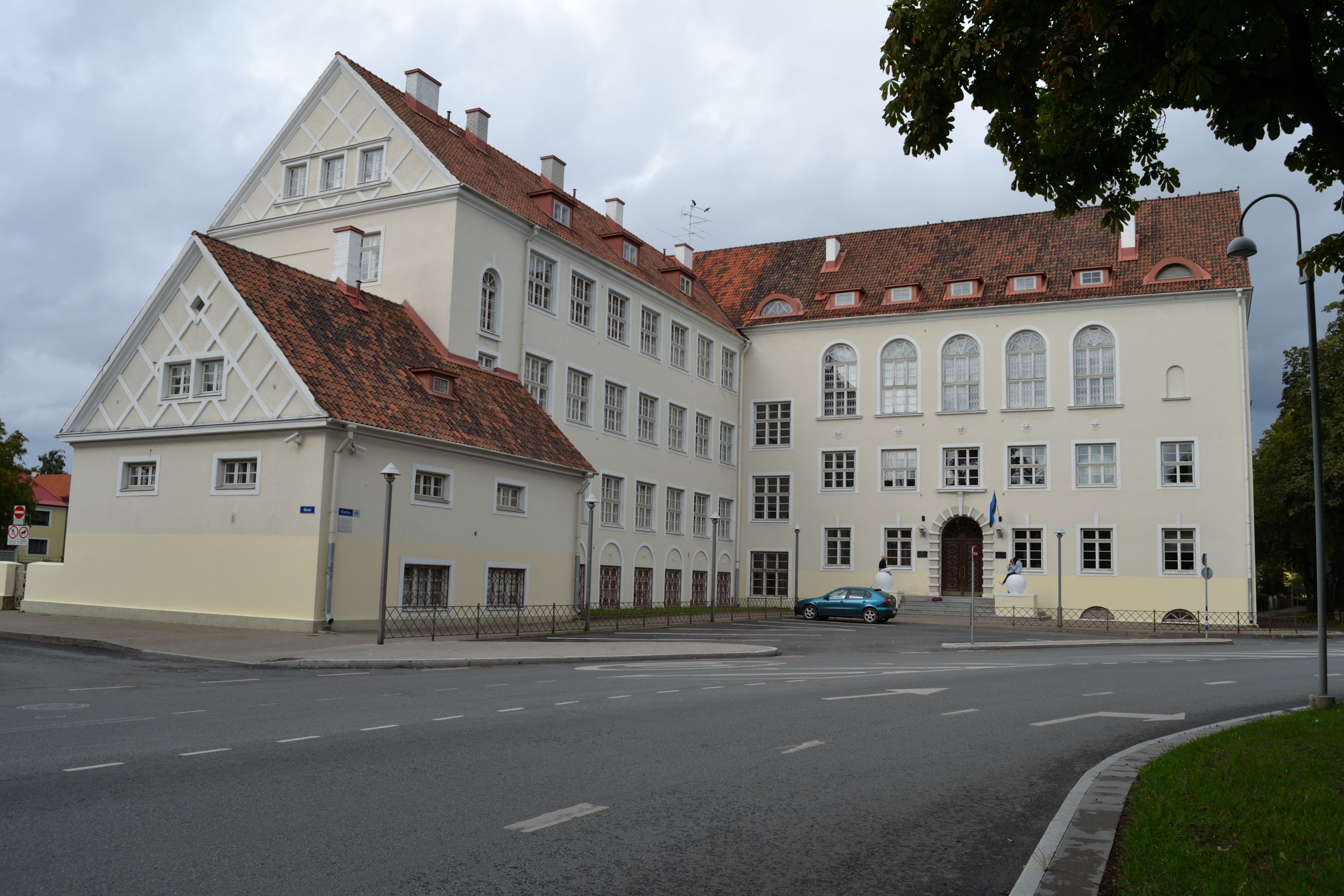
Ristiku Basic School

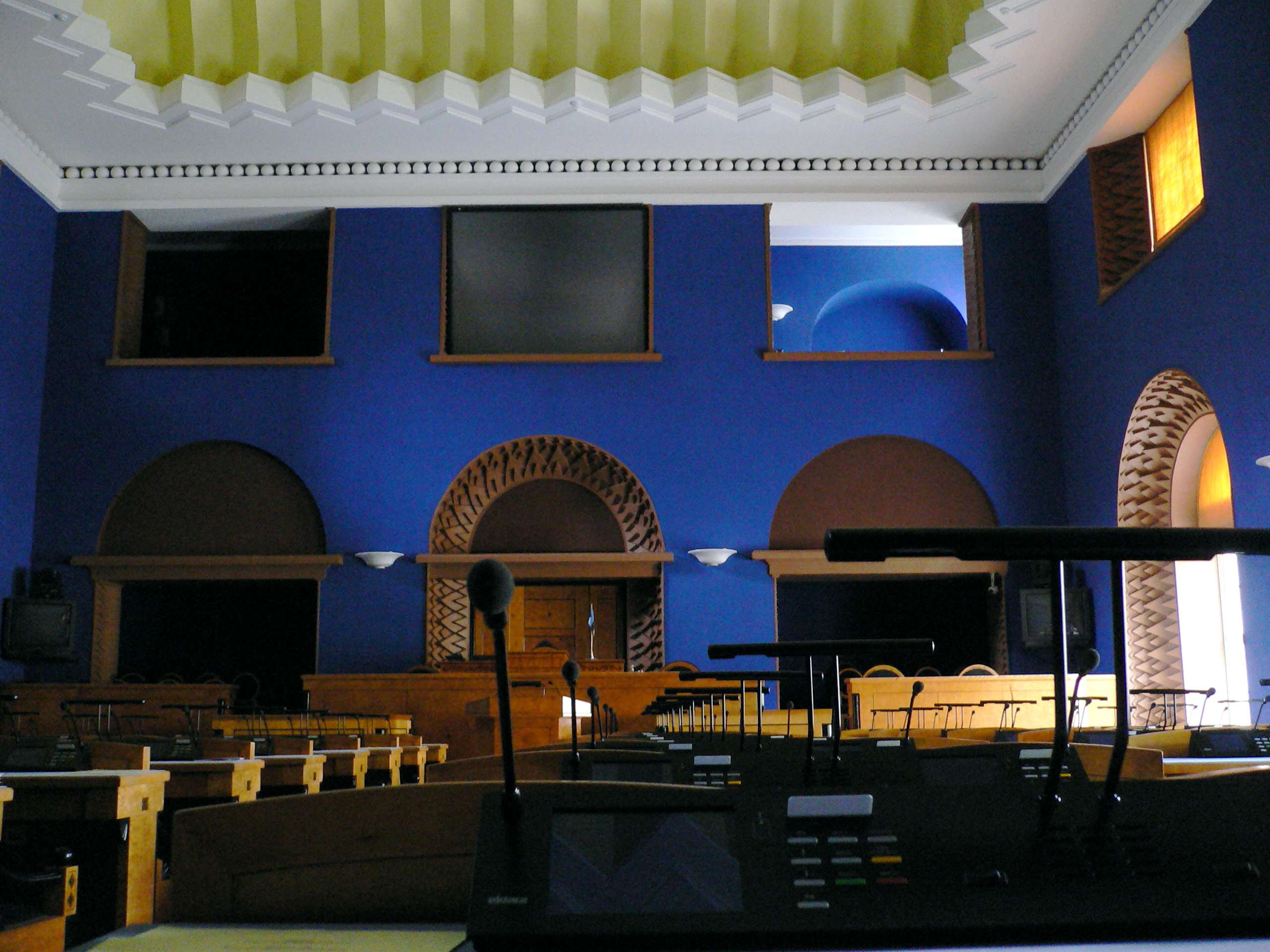
Sitting chamber of Riigikogu

Herbert Voldemar Johanson (10 September 1884 in Haljala, Estonia – 24 November 1964 in Gothenburg, Sweden) was an Estonian architect.

== Works ==
- Building of the Parliament of Estonia, Riigikogu in Toompea Castle; 1920 with Eugen Habermann
- Ristiku Basic School; 1927–1929
- Tallinn School of Service (Tallinna Teeninduskool); 1932–1935
- Tallinn French School (Tallinna Prantsuse Lütseum); completed 1937
- Chapel in Metsakalmistu; 1936–1937
- Fire station in centre of Tallinn; 1936–1939
- Central Hospital in Tallinn; 1937–1945
- Tallinn Coeducational Gymnasium (Tallinna Ühisgümnaasium); 1938–1940
- Jakob Westholm Gymnasium (Jakob Westholmi gümnaasium); 1938–1940
