= Mart Opmann =

Estonian politician (born 1956)

Mart Opmann (born 27 March 1956 in Surju) is an Estonian politician. He has been a member of X Riigikogu.

1995–1999 he was Minister of Finance.

He was a member of the People's Union of Estonia party.
