= Eugen Habermann =

Estonian architect

Eugen Habermann (19 October 1884 in Tallinn, Russian Empire – 22 September 1944 in the Baltic Sea) was an Estonian architect, representative of functionalism, chief architect of Tallinn (1914–1923).

== Examples of his work ==
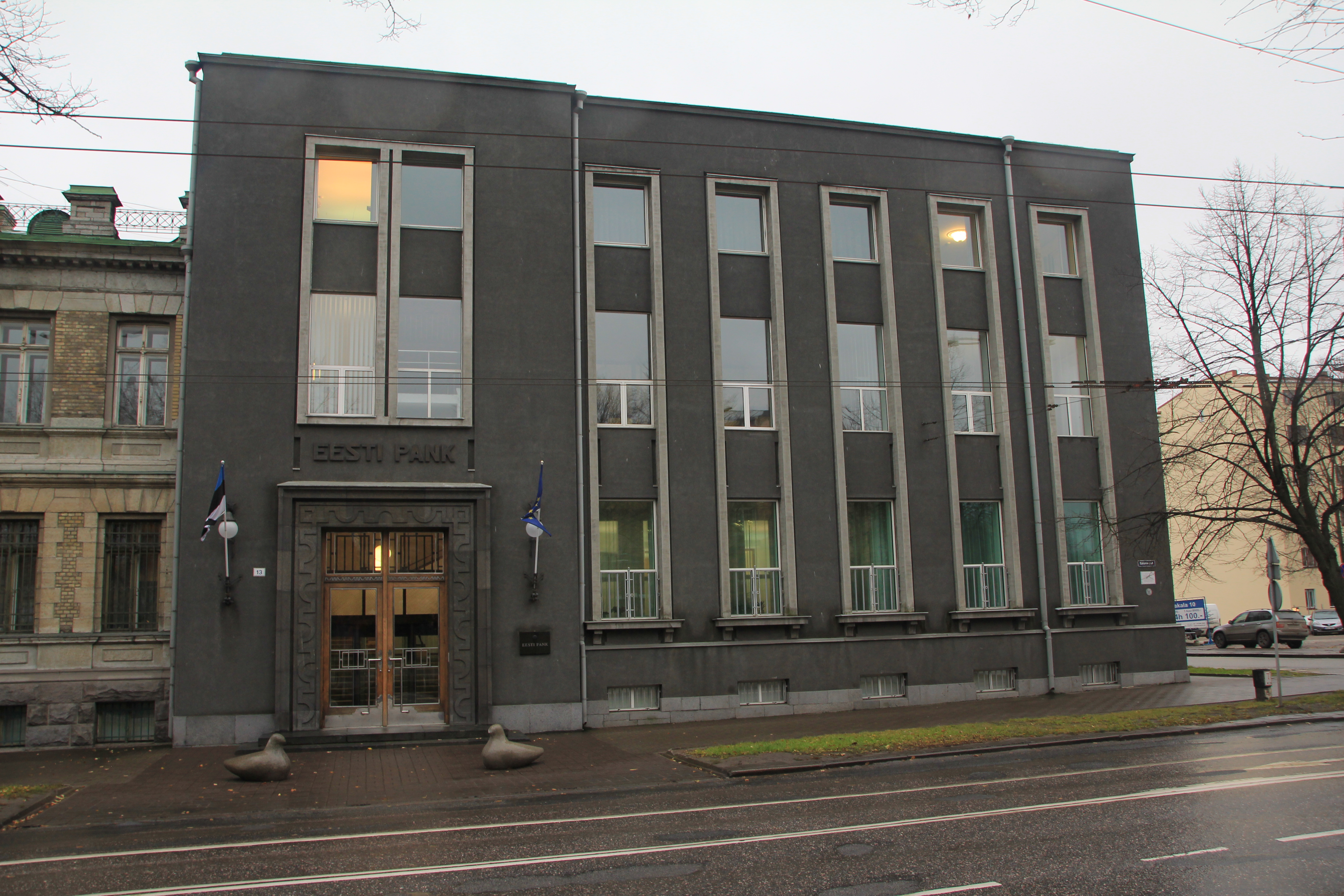
Main building of Bank of Estonia

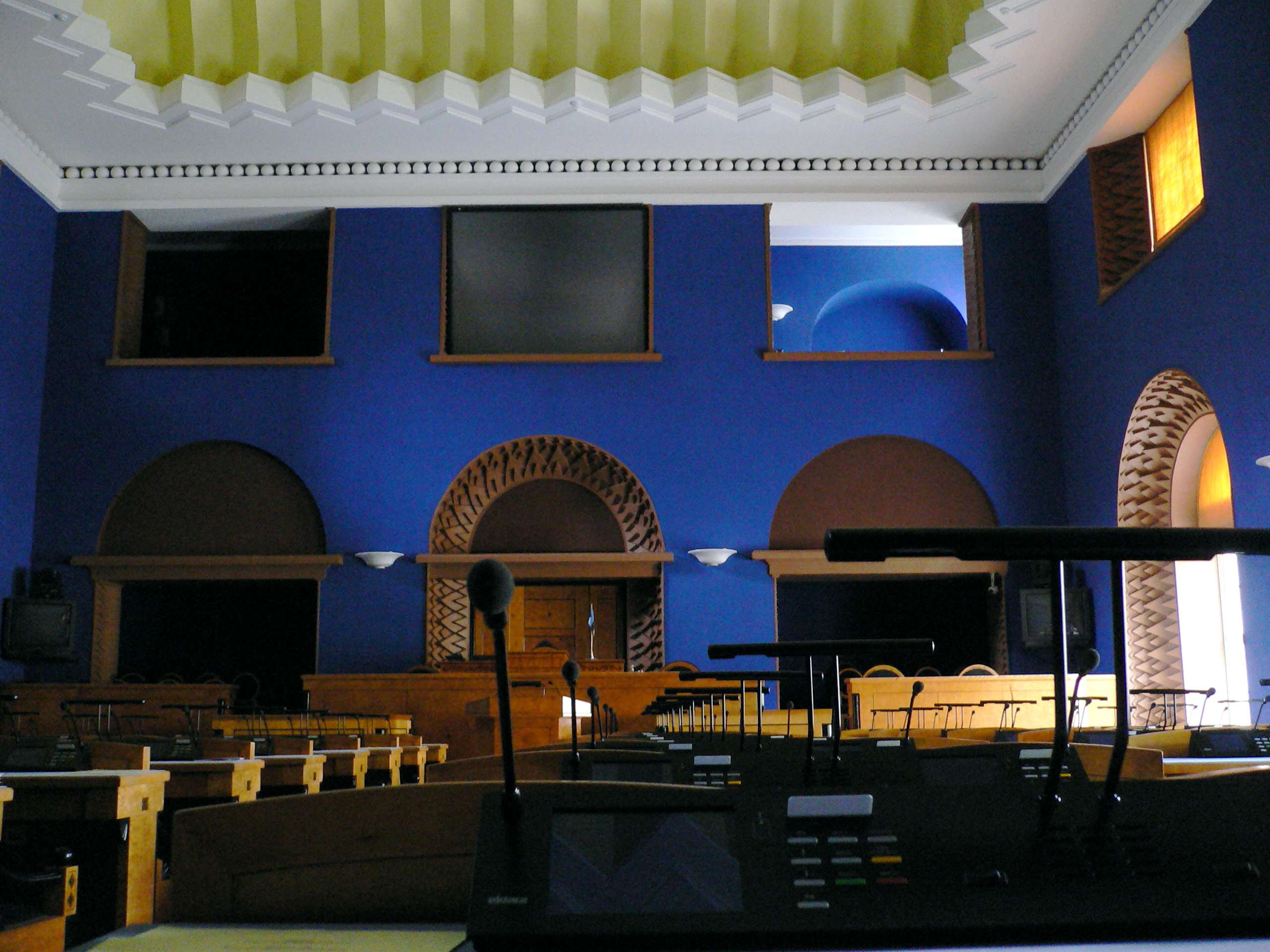
Hall of the Riigikogu, Estonian Parliament

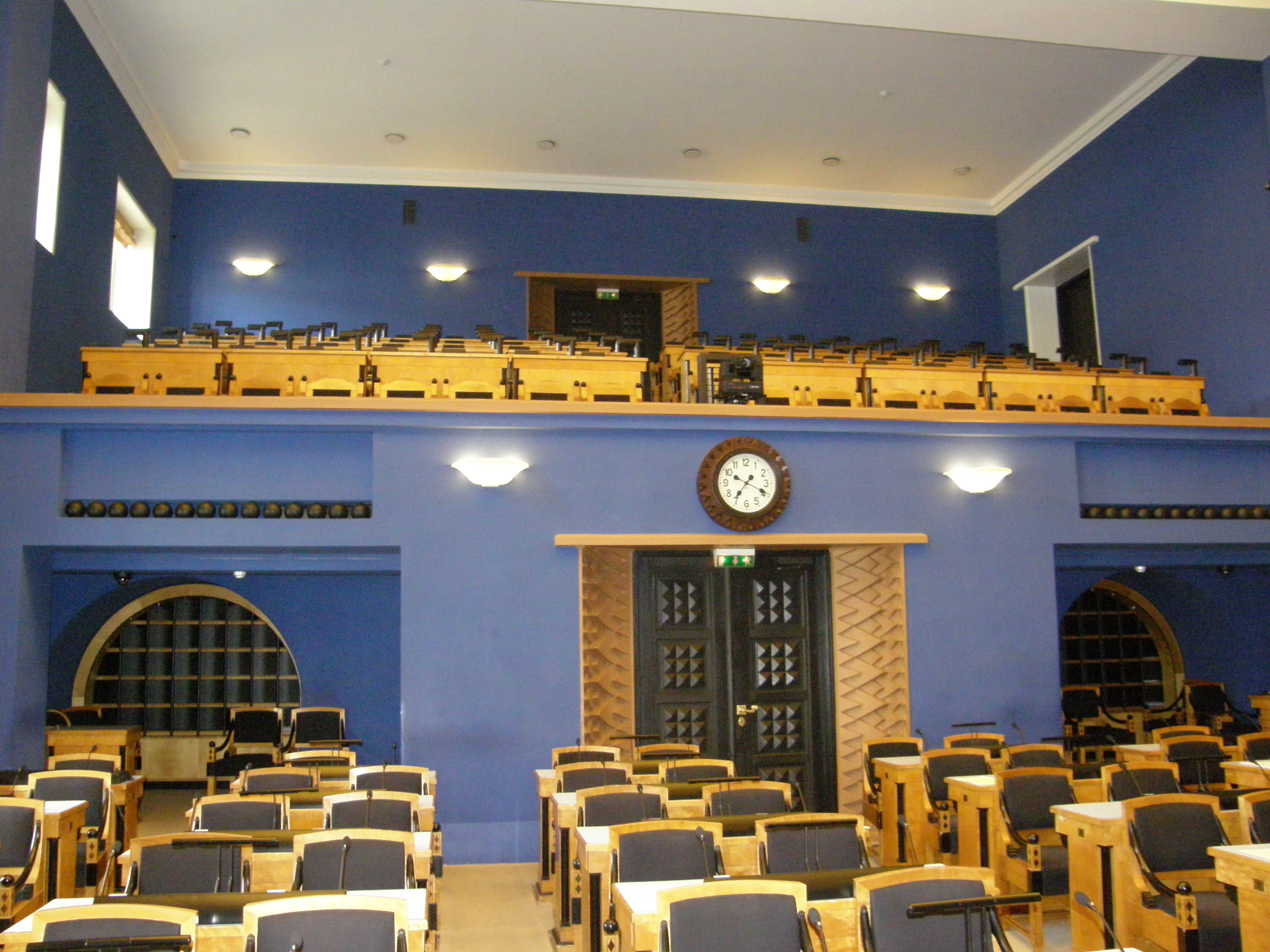
Hall of the Riigikogu, Estonian Parliament
