= Langlands =

Langlands is a traditional English surname stemming from Middle English. It refers to the land holdings of the original person so named, and literally means “long (or vast) lands”. It may refer to:

== People ==
- Alex Langlands, British archaeologist and historian
- Alan Langlands, vice chancellor of the University of Leeds
- Anders Langlands, visual effects supervisor
- Geoffrey Langlands (1917–2019), British army officer and educator
- George Langlands (1886–1951), Scottish footballer
- Graeme Langlands (1941–2018), Australian rugby player and coach
- Langlands and Bell, English artists
- Robert Langlands (born 1936), Canadian mathematician
  - Langlands classification
  - Langlands decomposition
  - Langlands dual
  - Langlands group
  - Langlands program

== Other uses ==
- Langlands, Queensland, a locality in the Western Downs Region, Queensland, Australia
- Langlands Park, a rugby league park in Brisbane, Queensland, Australia
- Langlands (villa), a building in Kinnoull, Scotland
