= Rankin–Selberg method =

Mathematical Theory

In mathematics, the Rankin–Selberg method, introduced by Rankin (1939) and Selberg (1940), also known as the theory of integral representations of L-functions, is a technique for directly constructing and analytically continuing several important examples of automorphic L-functions. Some authors reserve the term for a special type of integral representation, namely those that involve an Eisenstein series. It has been one of the most powerful techniques for studying the Langlands program.

== History ==
The theory in some sense dates back to Bernhard Riemann, who exhibited the zeta function as the Mellin transform of Jacobi's theta function. Riemann used asymptotics of the theta function to obtain the analytic continuation, and the automorphy of the theta function to prove the functional equation. Erich Hecke, and later Hans Maass, applied the same Mellin transform method to modular forms on the upper half-plane, after which Riemann's example can be seen as a special case.

Robert Alexander Rankin and Atle Selberg independently constructed their convolution L-functions, now thought of as the Langlands L-function associated to the tensor product of standard representation of GL(2) with itself. Like Riemann, they used an integral of modular forms, but of a different type: they integrated the product of two weight-$k$ modular forms $f,g$ for $\Gamma=\mathbf{SL}_2(\mathbf Z)$ with a real analytic Eisenstein series $E(z,s)$ over a fundamental domain $D$ of the modular group $\Gamma$ acting on the complex upper half plane $\mathfrak H$ by fractional linear transformations:

$$\displaystyle I(s) = \int_Df(z)\overline{g(z)}E(z,s)\mathfrak{Im}(z)^k\; d\mu(z),\quad\mathfrak{Re} (s)>1,$$

where $\mu$ is the $\mathrm{SL}_2(\mathbf R)$-invariant measure on $\mathfrak H$ given by $y^{-2}dxdy$. The integral converges absolutely if one of the two forms is cuspidal; otherwise the asymptotics must be used to get a meromorphic continuation like Riemann did. The analytic continuation and functional equation then boil down to those of the Eisenstein series. The integral was identified with the convolution L-function by a technique called "unfolding", in which the definition of the Eisenstein series and the range of integration are converted into a simpler expression that more readily exhibits the L-function as a Dirichlet series. The simultaneous combination of an unfolding together with global control over the analytic properties, is special and what makes the technique successful.

== Modern adelic theory ==
Hervé Jacquet and Robert Langlands later gave adelic integral representations for the standard, and tensor product L-functions that had been earlier obtained by Riemann, Hecke, Maass, Rankin, and Selberg. They gave a very complete theory, in that they elucidated formulas for all local factors, stated the functional equation in a precise form, and gave sharp analytic continuations.

== Generalizations and limitations ==
Nowadays one has integral representations for a large constellation of automorphic L-functions, however with two frustrating caveats. The first is that it is not at all clear which L-functions possibly have integral representations, or how they may be found; it is feared that the method is near exhaustion, though time and again new examples are found via clever arguments. The second is that in general it is difficult or perhaps even impossible to compute the local integrals after the unfolding stage. This means that the integrals may have the desired analytic properties, only that they may not represent an L-function (but instead something close to it).

Thus, having an integral representation for an L-function by no means indicates its analytic properties are resolved: there may be serious analytic issues remaining. At minimum, though, it ensures the L-function has an algebraic construction through formal manipulations of an integral of automorphic forms, and that at all but a finite number of places it has the conjectured Euler product of a particular L-function. In many situations the Langlands–Shahidi method gives complementary information.

== Notable examples ==
- Standard L-function on GL(n) (Godement–Jacquet). The theory was completely resolved in the original manuscript.
- Standard L-function on classical groups (Piatetski-Shapiro-Rallis). This construction was known as the doubling method and works for non-generic representations as well.
- Tensor product L-function on GL(n) × G with G a classical group (Cai-Friedberg-Ginzburg-Kaplan). This construction was a vast generalization of the doubling method, now known as the generalized doubling method.
- Tensor product L-function on GL(n) × GL(m) (includes the standard L-function if m = 1), due to Jacquet, Piatetski-Shapiro, and Shalika. The theory was completely resolved by Moeglin–Waldspurger, and was reverse-engineered to establish the "converse theorem".
- Symmetric square on GL(n) due to Shimura, and Gelbart–Jacquet (n = 2), Piatetski-Shapiro and Patterson (n = 3), and Bump–Ginzburg (n > 3).
- Exterior square on GL(n), due to Jacquet–Shalika and Bump–Friedberg.
- Triple Product on GL(2) × GL(2) × GL(2) (Garrett, as well as Harris, Ikeda, Piatetski-Shapiro, Rallis, Ramakrishnan, and Orloff).
- Symmetric cube on GL(2) (Bump–Ginzburg–Hoffstein).
- Symmetric fourth power on GL(2) (Ginzburg–Rallis).
- Standard L-function of E_{6} and E_{7} (Ginzburg).
- Standard L-function of G_{2} (Ginzburg-Hundley, Gurevich-Segal).
