= Trace formula =

Trace formula may refer to:

- Arthur–Selberg trace formula, also known as invariant trace formula, Jacquet's relative trace formula, simple trace formula, stable trace formula
- Grothendieck trace formula, an analogue in algebraic geometry of the Lefschetz fixed-point theorem in algebraic topology, used to express the Hasse–Weil zeta function.
- Gutzwiller trace formula: See Quantum chaos
- Kuznetsov trace formula, an extension of the Petersson trace formula.
- Local trace formula, an analog of Arthur–Selberg trace formula
- Petersson trace formula
- Selberg trace formula
- Behrend's trace formula, or Behrend's fixed point formula a generalization of the Grothendieck–Lefschetz trace formula, that may be interpreted as a Selberg trace formula.

== See also ==
- List of zeta functions
- List of fixed point theorems
