= Local Langlands conjectures =

Mathematical conjectures in class field theory

In mathematics, the local Langlands conjectures, introduced by Robert Langlands, are part of the Langlands program. They describe a correspondence between the complex representations of a reductive algebraic group $G$ over a local field $F$, and representations of the Langlands group of $F$ into the $L$-group of $G$. This correspondence is not a bijection in general. The conjectures can be thought of as a generalization of local class field theory from abelian Galois groups to non-abelian Galois groups.

== Local Langlands conjectures for GL_{1} ==
The local Langlands conjectures for $\operatorname{GL}_1(K)$ follow from (and are essentially equivalent to) local class field theory. More precisely, the Artin map gives an isomorphism from the group $\operatorname{GL}_1(K)=K^\times$ to the abelianization of the Weil group. In particular, irreducible smooth representations of $\operatorname{GL}_1(K)$ are 1-dimensional as the group is abelian, so can be identified with homomorphisms of the Weil group to $\operatorname{GL}_1(\C)$. This gives the Langlands correspondence between homomorphisms of the Weil group to $\operatorname{GL}_1(\C)$ and irreducible smooth representations of $\operatorname{GL}_1(K)$.

== Representations of the Weil group ==
Representations of the Weil group do not quite correspond to irreducible smooth representations of general linear groups. To get a bijection, one has to slightly modify the notion of a representation of the Weil group, to something called a Weil–Deligne representation. This consists of a representation of the Weil group on a vector space $V$ together with a nilpotent endomorphism $N$ of $V$ such that $wNw^{-1}=\|w\|N$, or equivalently a representation of the Weil–Deligne group. In addition, the representation of the Weil group should have an open kernel and be (Frobenius) semisimple.

For every Frobenius semisimple complex $n$-dimensional Weil–Deligne representation $\rho$ of the Weil group of $F$ there is an L-function $L(s,\rho)$ and a local ε-factor $\varepsilon(s,\rho,\psi)$ (depending on a character $\psi$ of $F$).

== Representations of GL_{n}(F) ==
The representations of $\operatorname{GL}_n(F)$ appearing in the local Langlands correspondence are smooth irreducible complex representations.

- "Smooth" means that every vector is fixed by some open subgroup.
- "Irreducible" means that the representation is nonzero and has no subrepresentations other than 0 and itself.

Smooth irreducible complex representations are automatically admissible.

The Bernstein–Zelevinsky classification reduces the classification of irreducible smooth representations to cuspidal representations.

For every irreducible admissible complex representation $\pi$ there is an L-function $L(s,\pi)$ and a local $\varepsilon$-factor $\varepsilon(s,\pi,\psi)$ (depending on a character $\psi$ of $F$). More generally, if there are two irreducible admissible representations $\pi$ and $\pi'$ of general linear groups, there are local Rankin–Selberg convolution L-functions $L(s,\pi\times \pi')$ and $\varepsilon$-factors $\varepsilon(s,\pi\times \pi',\psi)$.

Bushnell and Kutzko described the irreducible admissible representations of general linear groups over local fields.

== Local Langlands conjectures for GL_{2} ==
The local Langlands conjecture for $\operatorname{GL}_2$ of a local field says that there is a (unique) bijection $\pi$ from 2-dimensional semisimple Weil-Deligne representations of the Weil group to irreducible smooth representations of $\operatorname{GL}_2(F)$ that preserves L-functions, $\varepsilon$-factors, and commutes with twisting by characters of $F^\times$.

Jacquet and Langlands verified the local Langlands conjectures for $\operatorname{GL}_2$ in the case when the residue field does not have characteristic 2. In this case, the representations of the Weil group are all of cyclic or dihedral type.

Gelfand & Graev (1962) classified the smooth irreducible representations of $\operatorname{GL}_2(F)$ when $F$ has odd residue characteristic (see also (Gelfand, Graev & Pyatetskii-Shapiro 1969, chapter 2)), and claimed incorrectly that the classification for even residue characteristic differs only insignifictanly from the odd residue characteristic case. Weil pointed out that when the residue field has characteristic 2, there are some extra exceptional 2-dimensional representations of the Weil group whose image in $\operatorname{PGL}_2(\C)$ is of tetrahedral or octahedral type. (For global Langlands conjectures, 2-dimensional representations can also be of icosahedral type, but this cannot happen in the local case as the Galois groups are solvable.)

Tunnell proved the local Langlands conjectures for the general linear group $\operatorname{GL}_2(K)$ over the 2-adic numbers, and over local fields containing a cube root of unity. Kutzko proved the local Langlands conjectures for the general linear group $\operatorname{GL}_2(K)$ over all local fields.

Cartier, as well as Bushnell and Henniart, gave expositions of the proof.

== Local Langlands conjectures for GL_{n} ==
The local Langlands conjectures for general linear groups state that there are unique bijections $\pi\leftrightarrow \rho_\pi$ from equivalence classes of irreducible admissible representations $\pi$ of $\operatorname{GL}_n(F)$ to equivalence classes of continuous Frobenius semisimple complex $n$-dimensional Weil–Deligne representations $\rho_\pi$ of the Weil group of $F$ that preserve L-functions and $\varepsilon$-factors of pairs of representations, and coincide with the Artin map for 1-dimensional representations. In other words,

- $L(s,\rho_\pi\otimes \rho_{\pi'}) = L(s,\pi\times \pi')$
- $\varepsilon(s,\rho_\pi\otimes \rho_{\pi'},\psi) = \varepsilon(s,\pi\times \pi',\psi).$

Laumon, Rapoport and Stuhler proved the local Langlands conjectures for the general linear group $\operatorname{GL}_n(K)$ for positive characteristic local fields $K$. Carayol gave an exposition of their work.

Harris and Taylor proved the local Langlands conjectures for the general linear group $\operatorname{GL}_n(K)$ for characteristic 0 local fields $K$. Henniart gave another proof. Carayol and Wedhorn gave expositions of their work.

== Local Langlands conjectures for other groups ==
Borel and Vogan discuss the Langlands conjectures for more general groups. The Langlands conjectures for arbitrary reductive groups $G$ are more complicated to state than the ones for general linear groups, and it is unclear what the best way of stating them should be. Roughly speaking, admissible representations of a reductive group are grouped into disjoint finite sets called L-packets, which should correspond to some classes of homomorphisms, called L-parameters, from the local Langlands group to the L-group of $G$. Some earlier versions used the Weil−Deligne group or the Weil group instead of the local Langlands group, which gives a slightly weaker form of the conjecture.

Langlands proved the Langlands conjectures for groups over $\R$ and $\C$ by giving the Langlands classification of their irreducible admissible representations (up to infinitesimal equivalence), or, equivalently, of their irreducible $(\mathfrak{g},K)$-modules.

Gan and Takeda proved the local Langlands conjectures for the symplectic similitude group $\operatorname{GSp}(4)$ and used that to deduce it for the symplectic group $\operatorname{Sp}(4)$.
