= Standard L-function =

Mathematical concept

In mathematics, the term standard L-function refers to a particular type of automorphic L-function described by Robert P. Langlands. Here, standard refers to the finite-dimensional representation r being the standard representation of the L-group as a matrix group.

== Relations to other L-functions ==
Standard L-functions are thought to be the most general type of L-function. Conjecturally, they include all examples of L-functions, and in particular are expected to coincide with the Selberg class. Furthermore, all L-functions over arbitrary number fields are widely thought to be instances of standard L-functions for the general linear group GL(n) over the rational numbers Q. This makes them a useful testing ground for statements about L-functions, since it sometimes affords structure from the theory of automorphic forms.

== Analytic properties ==
These L-functions were proven to always be entire by Roger Godement and Hervé Jacquet, with the sole exception of Riemann ζ-function, which arises for n = 1. Another proof was later given by Freydoon Shahidi using the Langlands–Shahidi method. For a broader discussion, see Gelbart & Shahidi (1988).

== See also ==
- Zeta function
