= Lafforgue's theorem =

Completes the Langlands program for general linear groups over algebraic function fields

In mathematics, Lafforgue's theorem, due to Laurent Lafforgue, completes the Langlands program for general linear groups over algebraic function fields, by giving a correspondence between automorphic forms on these groups and representations of Galois groups.

The Langlands conjectures were introduced by Langlands (1967, 1970) and describe a correspondence between representations of the Weil group of an algebraic function field and representations of algebraic groups over the function field, generalizing class field theory of function fields from abelian Galois groups to non-abelian Galois groups.

== Langlands conjectures for GL_{1} ==
The Langlands conjectures for GL_{1}(K) follow from (and are essentially equivalent to) class field theory. More precisely the Artin map gives a map from the idele class group to the abelianization of the Weil group.

== Automorphic representations of GL_{n}(F) ==
The representations of GL_{n}(F) appearing in the Langlands correspondence are automorphic representations.

== Lafforgue's theorem for GL_{n}(F) ==
Here F is a global field of some positive characteristic p, and ℓ is some prime not equal to p.

Lafforgue's theorem states that there is a bijection σ between:

- Equivalence classes of cuspidal representations π of GL_{n}(F), and
- Equivalence classes of irreducible ℓ-adic representations σ(π) of dimension n of the absolute Galois group of F

that preserves the L-function at every place of F.

The proof of Lafforgue's theorem involves constructing a representation σ(π) of the absolute Galois group for each cuspidal representation π. The idea of doing this is to look in the ℓ-adic cohomology of the moduli stack of shtukas of rank n that have compatible level N structures for all N. The cohomology contains subquotients of the form

π⊗σ(π)⊗σ(π)^{∨}

which can be used to construct σ(π) from π. A major problem is that the moduli stack is not of finite type, which means that there are formidable technical difficulties in studying its cohomology.

== Applications ==
Lafforgue's theorem implies the Ramanujan–Petersson conjecture that if an automorphic form for GL_{n}(F) has central character of finite order, then the corresponding Hecke eigenvalues at every unramified place have absolute value 1.

Lafforgue's theorem implies the conjecture of Deligne (1980, 1.2.10) that an irreducible finite-dimensional l-adic representation of the absolute Galois group with determinant character of finite order is pure of weight 0.

== See also ==
- Local Langlands conjectures
