= Automorphic Forms on GL(2) =

1970 mathematics text by Jacquet and Landlands

- Authors: Hervé Jacquet, Robert Langlands
- Language: English
- Series: Lecture Notes in Mathematics; Vol.114
- Genre: Mathematics
- Publisher: Springer
- Publication date: 1970
- Publication place: United States
- Media type: Print
- Pages: 554
- ISBN: 978-3-540-04903-6
- Dewey Decimal: 515.9

Automorphic Forms on GL(2) is a 1970 mathematics book by Hervé Jacquet and Robert Langlands in which they rewrite Erich Hecke's theory of modular forms in terms of the representation theory of GL(2) over local fields and adele rings of global fields, and prove the Jacquet–Langlands correspondence.

A second volume by Jacquet gives an interpretation of some results by Rankin and Selberg in terms of the representation theory of GL(2) × GL(2).
