= Langlands–Shahidi method =

In mathematics, the Langlands–Shahidi method provides the means to define automorphic L-functions in many cases that arise with connected reductive groups over a number field. This includes Rankin–Selberg products for cuspidal automorphic representations of general linear groups. The method develops the theory of the local coefficient, which links to the global theory via Eisenstein series. The resulting L-functions satisfy a number of analytic properties, including an important functional equation.

== The local coefficient ==
The setting is in the generality of a connected quasi-split reductive group G, together with a Levi subgroup M, defined over a local field F. For example, if G = G_{l} is a classical group of rank l, its maximal Levi subgroups are of the form GL(m) × G_{n}, where G_{n} is a classical group of rank n and of the same type as G_{l}, l = m + n. F. Shahidi develops the theory of the local coefficient for irreducible generic representations of M(F). The local coefficient is defined by means of the uniqueness property of Whittaker models paired with the theory of intertwining operators for representations obtained by parabolic induction from generic representations.

The global intertwining operator appearing in the functional equation of Langlands' theory of Eisenstein series can be decomposed as a product of local intertwining operators. When M is a maximal Levi subgroup, local coefficients arise from Fourier coefficients of appropriately chosen Eisenstein series and satisfy a crude functional equation involving a product of partial L-functions.

== Local factors and functional equation ==
An induction step refines the crude functional equation of a globally generic cuspidal automorphic representation $\pi = \otimes' \pi_v$ to individual functional equations of partial L-functions and γ-factors:

$$L^S(s,\pi,r_i) = \prod_{v \in S} \gamma_i(s,\pi_v,\psi_v) L^S(1-s,\tilde{\pi},r_i).$$

The details are technical: s a complex variable, S a finite set of places (of the underlying global field) with $\pi_v$ unramified for v outside of S, and $r = \oplus r_i$ is the adjoint action of M on the complex Lie algebra of a specific subgroup of the Langlands dual group of G. When G is the special linear group SL(2), and M = T is the maximal torus of diagonal matrices, then π is a Größencharakter and the corresponding γ-factors are the local factors of Tate's thesis.

The γ-factors are uniquely characterized by their role in the functional equation and a list of local properties, including multiplicativity with respect to parabolic induction. They satisfy a relationship involving Artin L-functions and Artin root numbers when v gives an archimedean local field or when v is non-archimedean and $\pi_v$ is a constituent of an unramified principal series representation of M(F). Local L-functions and root numbers ε$(s,\pi_v,r_{i,v},\psi_v)$ are then defined at every place, including $v \in S$, by means of Langlands classification for p-adic groups. The functional equation takes the form

$$L(s,\pi,r_i) = \epsilon(s,\pi,r_i) L(1-s,\tilde{\pi},r_i),$$

where $L(s,\pi,r_i)$ and $\epsilon(s,\pi,r_i)$ are the completed global L-function and root number.

== Examples of automorphic L-functions ==
- $L(s,\pi_1 \times \pi_2)$, the Rankin–Selberg L-function of cuspidal automorphic representations $\pi_1$ of GL(m) and $\pi_2$ of GL(n).
- $L(s,\tau \times \pi)$, where τ is a cuspidal automorphic representation of GL(m) and π is a globally generic cuspidal automorphic representation of a classical group G.
- $L(s,\tau,r)$, with τ as before and r a symmetric square, an exterior square, or an Asai representation of the dual group of GL(n).

A full list of Langlands–Shahidi L-functions depends on the quasi-split group G and maximal Levi subgroup M. More specifically, the decomposition of the adjoint action $r = \oplus r_i$ can be classified using Dynkin diagrams. A first study of automorphic L-functions via the theory of Eisenstein Series can be found in Langlands' Euler Products, under the assumption that the automorphic representations are everywhere unramified. What the Langlands–Shahidi method provides is the definition of L-functions and root numbers with no other condition on the representation of M other than requiring the existence of a Whittaker model.

== Analytic properties of L-functions ==
Global L-functions are said to be nice if they satisfy:

1. $L(s,\pi,r), \ L(s,\tilde{\pi}, r)$ extend to entire functions of the complex variable s.
2. $L(s,\pi,r), \ L(s,\tilde{\pi},r)$ are bounded in vertical strips.
3. (Functional Equation) $L(s,\pi,r) = \epsilon(s,\pi,r) L(1-s,\tilde{\pi},r)$.

Langlands–Shahidi L-functions satisfy the functional equation. Progress towards boundedness in vertical strips was made by S. S. Gelbart and F. Shahidi. And, after incorporating twists by highly ramified characters, Langlands–Shahidi L-functions do become entire.

Another result is the non-vanishing of L-functions. For Rankin–Selberg products of general linear groups it states that $L(1+it,\pi_1 \times \pi_2)$ is non-zero for every real number t.

== Applications to functoriality and to representation theory of p-adic groups ==
- Functoriality for the classical groups: A cuspidal globally generic automorphic representation of a classical group admits a Langlands functorial lift to an automorphic representation of GL(N), where N depends on the classical group. Then, the Ramanujan bounds of W. Luo, Z. Rudnick and P. Sarnak for GL(N) over number fields yield non-trivial bounds for the generalized Ramanujan conjecture of the classical groups.
- Symmetric powers for GL(2): Proofs of functoriality for the symmetric cube and for the symmetric fourth powers of cuspidal automorphic representations of GL(2) were made possible by the Langlands–Shahidi method. Progress towards higher Symmetric powers leads to the best possible bounds towards the Ramanujan–Peterson conjecture of automorphic cusp forms of GL(2).
- Representations of p-adic groups: Applications involving Harish-Chandra μ functions (from the Plancherel formula) and to complementary series of p-adic reductive groups are possible. For example, GL(n) appears as the Siegel Levi subgroup of a classical group G. If π is a smooth irreducible ramified supercuspidal representation of GL(n, F) over a field F of p-adic numbers, and $I(\pi) = I(0,\pi)$ is irreducible, then:
1. $I(s,\pi)$ is irreducible and in the complementary series for 0 < s < 1;
2. $I(1,\pi)$ is reducible and has a unique generic non-supercuspidal discrete series subrepresentation;
3. $I(s,\pi)$ is irreducible and never in the complementary series for s > 1.

Here, $I(s,\pi)$ is obtained by unitary parabolic induction from

- $\pi \otimes |\det|^s$ if G = SO(2n), Sp(2n), or U(n+1, n);
- $\pi \otimes |\det|^{s/2}$ if G = SO(2n+1) or U(n, n).
