= Hervé Jacquet =

French-American mathematician

- Born: 1939 (age 86–87); France
- Education: École Normale Supérieure
- Known for: Automorphic forms; Jacquet module; Jacquet–Langlands correspondence; Relative trace formula
- Scientific career
- Fields: Mathematics
- Workplaces: Columbia University
- Thesis: Fonctions de Whittaker associées aux groupes de Chevalley (1967)
- Doctoral advisor: Roger Godement

Hervé Jacquet is a French-American mathematician known for his research in automorphic forms. He is considered one of the founders of the theory of automorphic representations and their associated L-functions, and his results play a central role in modern number theory.

== Career ==
Jacquet entered the École Normale Supérieure in 1959 and obtained his doctorat d'état under the direction of Roger Godement in 1967. He held academic positions at the Centre National de la Recherche Scientifique (1963–1969), the Institute for Advanced Study in Princeton (1967–1969), the University of Maryland at College Park (1969–1970), the Graduate Center of the City University of New York (1970–1974), and became a professor at Columbia University in 1974, becoming Professor Emeritus in 2007.

== Mathematical work ==
The book by Jacquet and Robert Langlands on $\operatorname{GL}(2)$ was an eclipsing event in the history of number theory. It presented a representation theory of automorphic forms and their associated L−functions for the general linear group $\operatorname{GL}(2)$, establishing among other things the Jacquet–Langlands correspondence which explains very precisely how automorphic forms for $\operatorname{GL}(2)$ relate to those for quaternion algebras.

Equally important was the book by Godement and Jacquet, which defined, for the first time, the standard L-functions attached to automorphic representations of $\operatorname{GL}(n)$, now called Godement–Jacquet L-functions, and proved their basic, oft-used analytic properties.

His papers with Joseph Shalika and the papers with Ilya Piatetski-Shapiro and Shalika pertain to L-functions of pairs, called the Rankin-Selberg L-functions, attached to representations of $\operatorname{GL}(n)$ and $\operatorname{GL}(m)$, and the so-called converse theorem, which are crucial to our understanding of automorphic forms. A basic ingredient of this effort was an elaboration of properties of Whittaker models and functions, which Jacquet had made contributions to since his thesis. The papers with Shalika also established the uniqueness of isobaric decompositions of automorphic forms on $\operatorname{GL}(n)$, thus providing evidence for certain conjectures of Langlands.

In the mid-1980s, Jacquet forayed into a new territory in the field and created the relative trace formula in representation theory, an important tool in modern number theory, which vastly generalizes the Kuznetsov and Petersson formulae from the classical setup. While the usual Selberg trace formula, as well as its generalizations due to James Arthur, consists in developing an expression for the integral of the kernel over the diagonal, the relative version integrates the kernel over other appropriate subgroups.

== Awards and honors ==
He was elected corresponding member of the Académie des Sciences in 1980. In 2012 he became a fellow of the American Mathematical Society. He was elected to the American Academy of Arts and Sciences in 2013.

== See also ==
- Jacquet module
