= Ardo Hansson =

Estonian economist

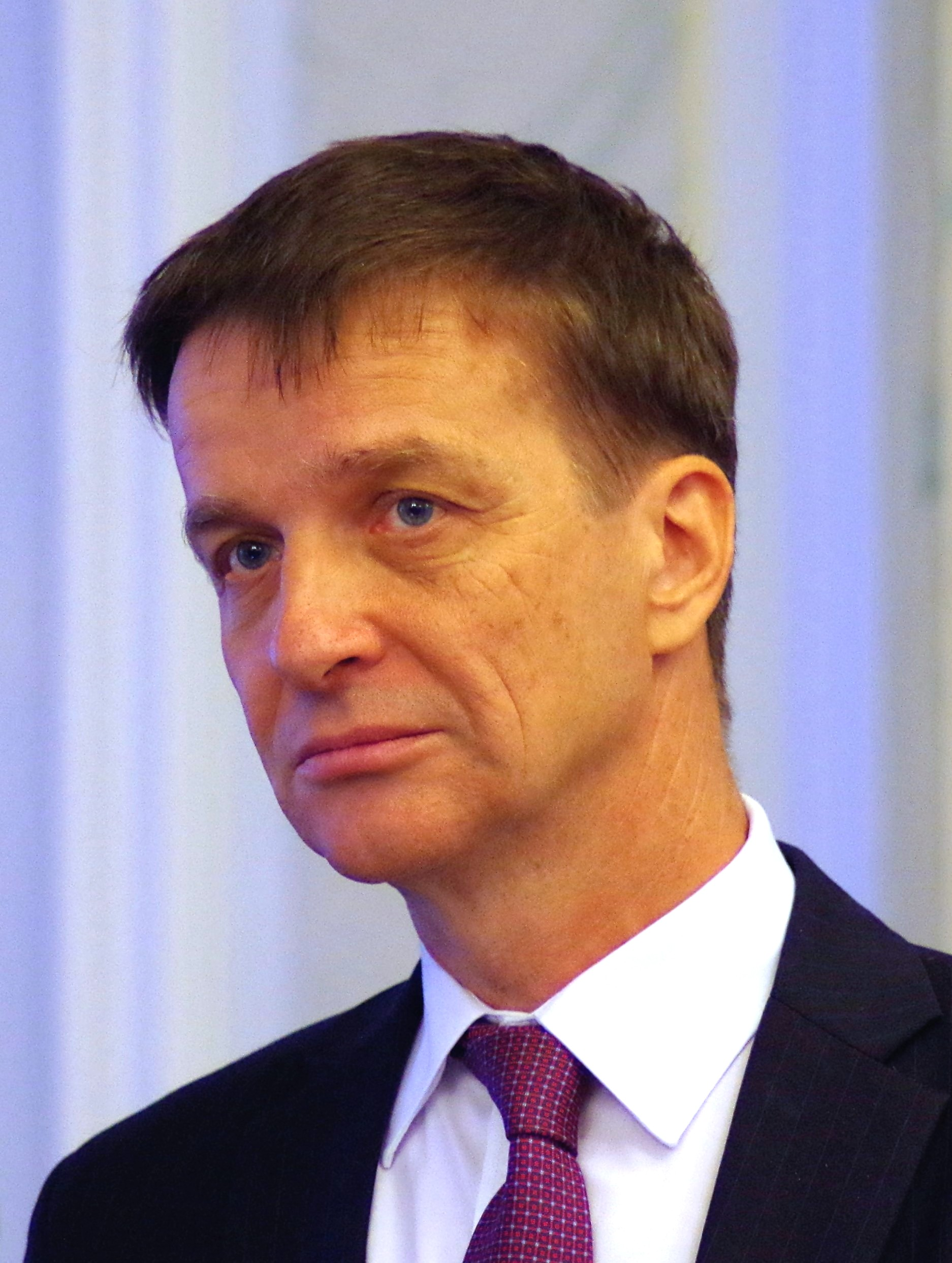

Governor of the Bank of Estonia
- In office 7 June 2012 – 7 June 2019
- Preceded by: Andres Lipstok
- Succeeded by: Madis Müller

Personal details
- Born: 15 July 1958 (age 67) Chicago, Illinois, U.S.
- Education: University of British Columbia; Harvard University

Ardo Hillar Hansson (born 15 July 1958) is an Estonian economist. He was the Governor of Bank of Estonia from 2012 to 2019. He previously worked as a senior economist at the World Bank for several European countries, and chief of its Economic Policy Unit in China. He was one of three committeemen who were responsible for transitioning Estonia from the Soviet ruble to the Estonian kroon in 1992.

== Early life and academia ==
Ardo Hansson was born in Chicago on 15 July 1958 to Estonian parents. His parents left Estonia in 1944, and he grew up with his sister Anne in Chicago's Estonian diaspora community. Hansson moved to British Columbia with his family at age 14 in 1972 where they joined the Estonian diaspora community in Vancouver. He attended Semiahmoo Secondary School.

Hansson attended the University of British Columbia from 1976 to 1980, where he received a bachelor's degree in economics. He was then hired by the university as a research assistant and worked there until 1982 when he began studying at Harvard University. He made his first visits to Estonia, then part of the Soviet Union, in 1982 and 1985. Conversely, upcoming Estonian political figures like Mart Laar and Trivimi Velliste visited the Estonian community in Canada, where Hansson met them in 1988.

Hansson received a doctorate in economics from Harvard in 1987 under his doctoral adviser Jeffrey Sachs. He then became an assistant professor of economics at the University of British Columbia from 1987 to 1990. Sachs arranged for Hansson to work at the World Institute for Development Economics Research (WIDER) in Europe.

== Career ==
Hansson left Canada in 1990 to work at WIDER during a period of decommunization of post-Soviet states. He went to Estonia as its independence movement reestablished it as a sovereign nation in 1991.

Lennart Meri, the Minister of Foreign Affairs, took Hansson on as an informal adviser in 1991. Hansson then became an informal adviser of economic policy for Tiit Vähi, the Prime Minister of Estonia, in March 1992. The three-person Monetary Reform Committee was formed that year to transition Estonia from the Soviet ruble to the Estonian kroon, and Hansson was selected in June 1992 to replace one of its members who had fallen ill. The same year, he was made research fellow at the Stockholm School of Economics. He went on to be an economic advisor for several prime ministers over the following years. He stayed with the Stockholm School of Economics until 1996. He also worked for the Council of the Baltic Sea States from 1993 to 1994 as its Head of the Working Group on Economic Cooperation.

Hansson was placed on the supervisory board of the Bank of Estonia in 1993, holding the position until 1998. He briefly served on the Board of Estonian Railways in 1997. He received the 3rd class Order of the White Star in 1998.

Hansson worried that his career would be hampered if it was restricted to Estonia, so he moved to Poland to work for the World Bank in 1997. He became the World Bank's economist for the Baltic states and Poland in 1998 before becoming its senior economist for Lithuania (1999–2000), for Yugoslavia and its successor state Serbia and Montenegro (2000–2003), and for the western Balkans (2003–2008). He was made a full staff member in 2000 an began working at the World Bank headquarters in Washington, D.C. He became chief of the World Bank's Economic Policy Unit in China in 2008, and he moved to Beijing in 2009.

Hansson was selected to be governor of the Bank of Estonia by its board of directors in October 2011. His term began in June 2012 and ended in June 2019. As governor, he was also a member of the Governing Council of the European Central Bank and attended biweekly meetings in Frankfurt.

Hansson again became economic advisor to the prime minister in April 2021, working for Kaja Kallas.

== Personal life ==
Hansson is married to Triinu Tombak, with whom he has two sons.

== Other activities ==
- European Central Bank (ECB), Member of the Audit Committee (since 2022)
- International Monetary Fund (IMF), Ex-Officio Member of the Board of Governors

Political offices
Preceded by Andres Lipstok	Governor of the Bank of Estonia; 2012–2019	Succeeded by Madis Müller
