= Colin J. Bushnell =

British mathematician (1947–2021)

Colin John Bushnell
- Born: 1947
- Died: 1 January 2021 (aged 73–74)
- Education: King's College London
- Awards: Senior Whitehead Prize (1995); American Mathematical Society Fellow (2013)
- Scientific career
- Fields: Mathematics
- Workplaces: King's College London; University of Illinois at Urbana-Champaign
- Thesis: Representations of 2-graded groups (1972)
- Doctoral advisor: Albrecht Fröhlich

Colin John Bushnell (1947 – 1 January 2021) was a British mathematician specialising in number theory and representation theory. He spent most of his career at King's College London, including a stint as the head of the School of Physical Sciences and Engineering, and made several contributions to the representation theory of reductive p-adic groups and the local Langlands correspondence.

== Early life and education ==
Bushnell was born in 1947. He studied mathematics at King's College London, where he received his first class honors undergraduate degree and then a Ph.D. in 1972 under the supervision of Albrecht Fröhlich.

== Career ==
From 1972 to 1975, Bushnell was a lecturer at the University of Illinois at Urbana–Champaign. He returned to King's College London in 1975 as Lecturer, before being promoted to Reader in 1985 and Professor in 1990. From 1988 to 1989, he was a member of the Institute for Advanced Study. From 1996 to 1997, he was a chairman of the mathematics department and from 1997 to 2004 he was the head of the School of Physical Sciences and Engineering. He retired in 2014. He died on 1 January 2021 at the age of 73.

Bushnell has advised doctoral students including Graham Everest.

== Research ==
Bushnell's research included "major contributions to the representation theory of reductive p-adic groups and the study of the local Langlands correspondence."

== Awards ==
In 1994, Bushnell was an invited speaker at the International Congress of Mathematicians in Zurich (Smooth representations of p-adic groups: the role of compact open subgroups).

In 1995, Bushnell was awarded the Senior Whitehead Prize. In 2002, he became a Fellow of King's College London. He was inaugurated in the 2013 class of Fellows of the American Mathematical Society.

== Selected publications ==
- With Albrecht Fröhlich, Gauss sums and p-adic division algebras, lecture notes in mathematics, vol. 987, Springer Verlag 1983
- With Guy Henniart, The local Langlands conjecture for GL(2), Springer-Verlag, 2006, ISBN 3-540-31486-5 (Grundlehren der mathematischen Wissenschaften 335)
- With Philip Kutzko, The admissible dual of GL(N) via compact open subgroups, Annals of Mathematics Studies 129, Princeton University Press 1993
