= Semiahmoo Secondary School =

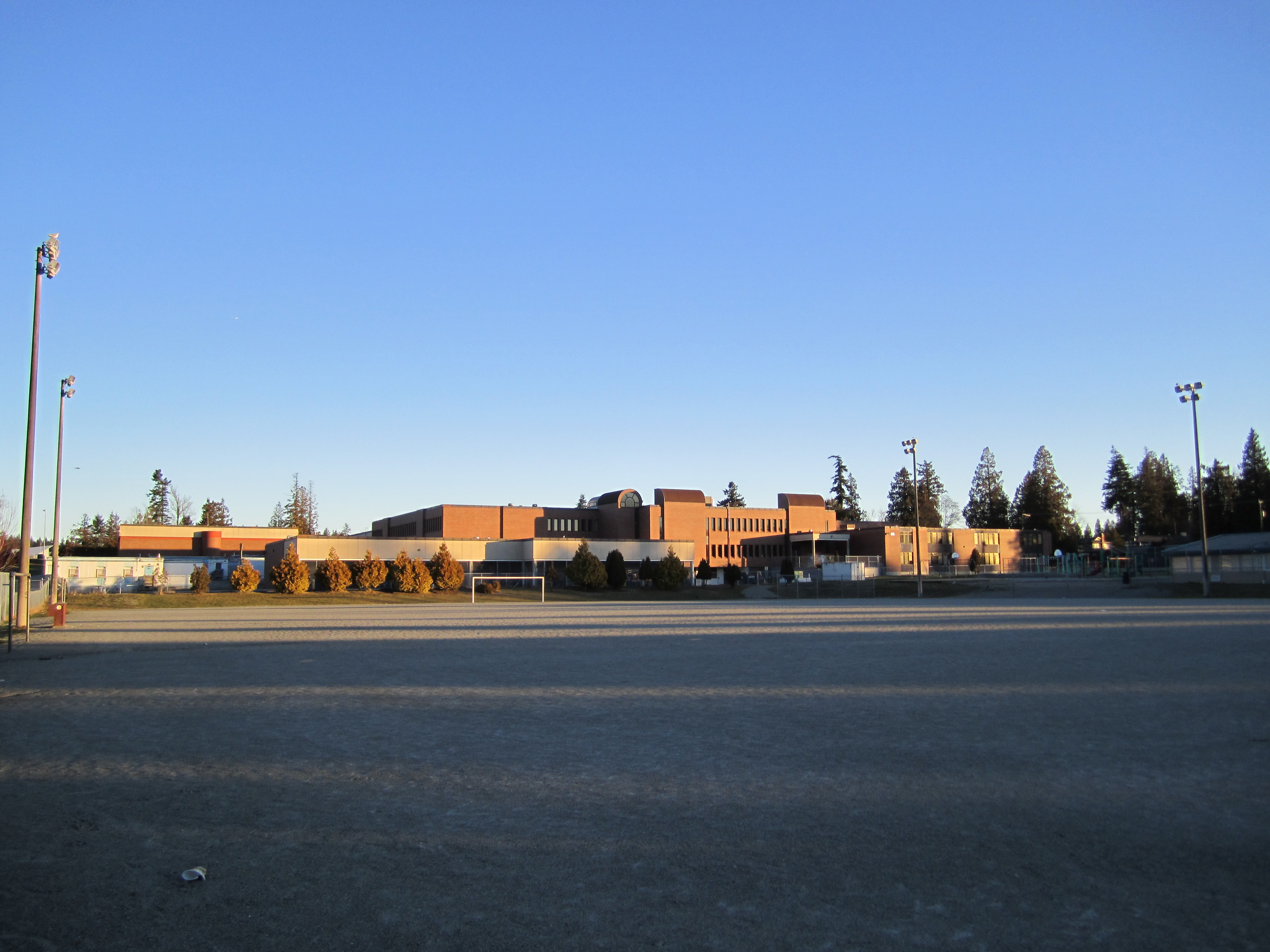

Location
- 1785 148th Street; Surrey, British Columbia; Canada; 49.0349°N 122.81364°W

Information
- Type: Public school
- Motto: "Semiahmoo...We are the future"
- Established: 1940
- School district: School District 36 Surrey
- Principal: Alyssa Malkoske
- Faculty: 119
- Enrollment: ▲1666 (2026)
- Colours: royal blue, white, and red
- Team name: Thunderbirds
- Affiliation: IB World School
- Website: www.surreyschools.ca/semiahmoo

Semiahmoo Secondary School (/ˌsɛmiˈæmuː/ SEM-ee-AM-moo) is a public high school in South Surrey, British Columbia, and is part of School District 36 Surrey. It was founded in 1940 as the first senior secondary school in South Surrey. The school serves grades eight through twelve.

Semiahmoo is one of four public high schools on the peninsula, along with Earl Marriott Secondary School, Elgin Park Secondary School and Grandview Heights Secondary School.

The school is named after the Indigenous Semiahmoo people.

== History ==
Before 1940, students from White Rock and Surrey were educated at Surrey High School in Cloverdale or Blaine High School in the state of Washington in the United States. Overcrowding at Surrey High School led to petitions for a new school; by the time the new school opened students were spread to the basement of Rock Public School, and the Campbell River Saw Mill Office. A three-storey wood-frame building was constructed in White Rock with 14 classrooms, a library, an Industrial Education shop, and a 50 by 80 feet gym with a large stage at the south end; it opened on November 29, 1940, as Semiahmoo. The building was expanded in the late-1950s and 1960s to alleviate overcrowding; the opening of White Rock Junior High and Douglas College providing additional relief.

In 1989, Semiahmoo High School absorbed White Rock Junior High to become Semiahmoo Secondary School; it moved into a new building on the latter's site on 148th Street. The old Semiahmoo building was occupied by White Rock Elementary School. The old building was demolished in 2004; the cupola was saved in 2004 and delivered to Semiahmoo for restoration in 2016.

== Academics ==
Semiahmoo Secondary School has been an International Baccalaureate (IB) World School since June 1981, making it one of the oldest IB programs in British Columbia. Surrey students are permitted to cross school boundaries to enter the IB program. Approximately 130 students in Grades 11 and 12 are enrolled in the IB Diploma Program at Semiahmoo. There is also the option of enrolling in the IB Certificate Program for up to three courses, which is only available for students who live in the Semiahmoo school catchment. Students apply to the program in the Grade 10 year by sending in the completed application package which can be found on the school's IB website. In 2022, Semiahmoo's IB graduates achieved an average grade of 37 out of 45 points; the global average was 32.

== Athletics ==
Semiahmoo has a track, baseball field, all weather soccer fields and a rugby field. There is also a beach volleyball court. Semiahmoo Secondary is known for its basketball team.

== Notable alumni ==
- Paul Campbell, actor, Battlestar Galactica
- Colton Gillies, left winger for the Columbus Blue Jackets
- Ardo Hansson, World Bank economist and Governor of the Bank of Estonia
- Gordie Hogg, politician
- Robert Langlands, mathematician, founder of the Langlands program
- Grant Lawrence, CBC Radio 3 host
- Gabrielle Miller, actress, Corner Gas and Robson Arms
- A.C. Newman, songwriter, leader of The New Pornographers
- Hannah Simone, former fashion model, actress, "New Girl", MuchMusic VJ
- Richard Weinberger, Olympic swimmer, bronze medalist
- Sean Whyte, CFL player, Edmonton Eskimos, and Lew Hayman Trophy winner

== Gallery ==
not the current logo

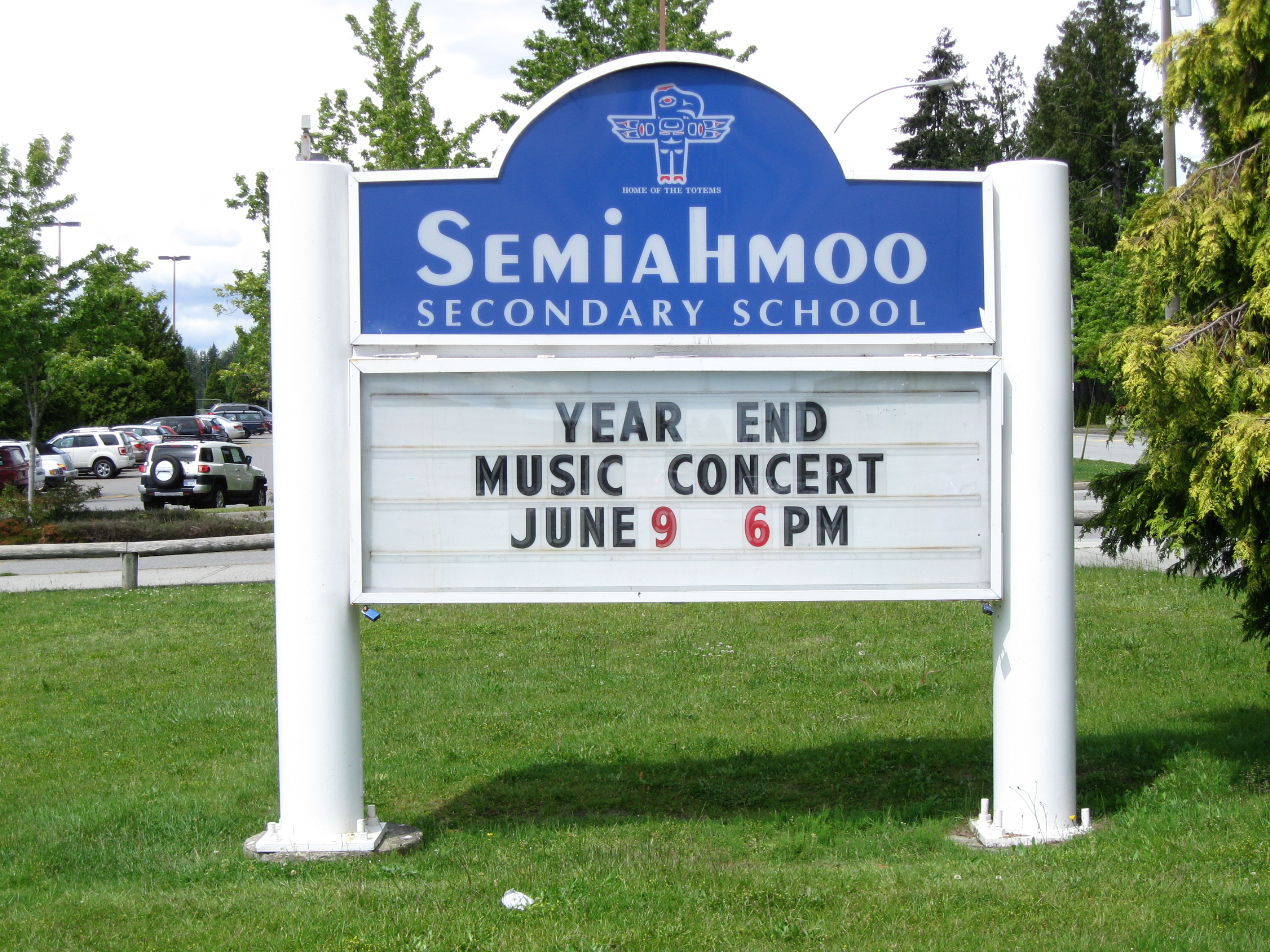
Semiahmoo Secondary noticeboard (replaced with an electronic version circa 2009)

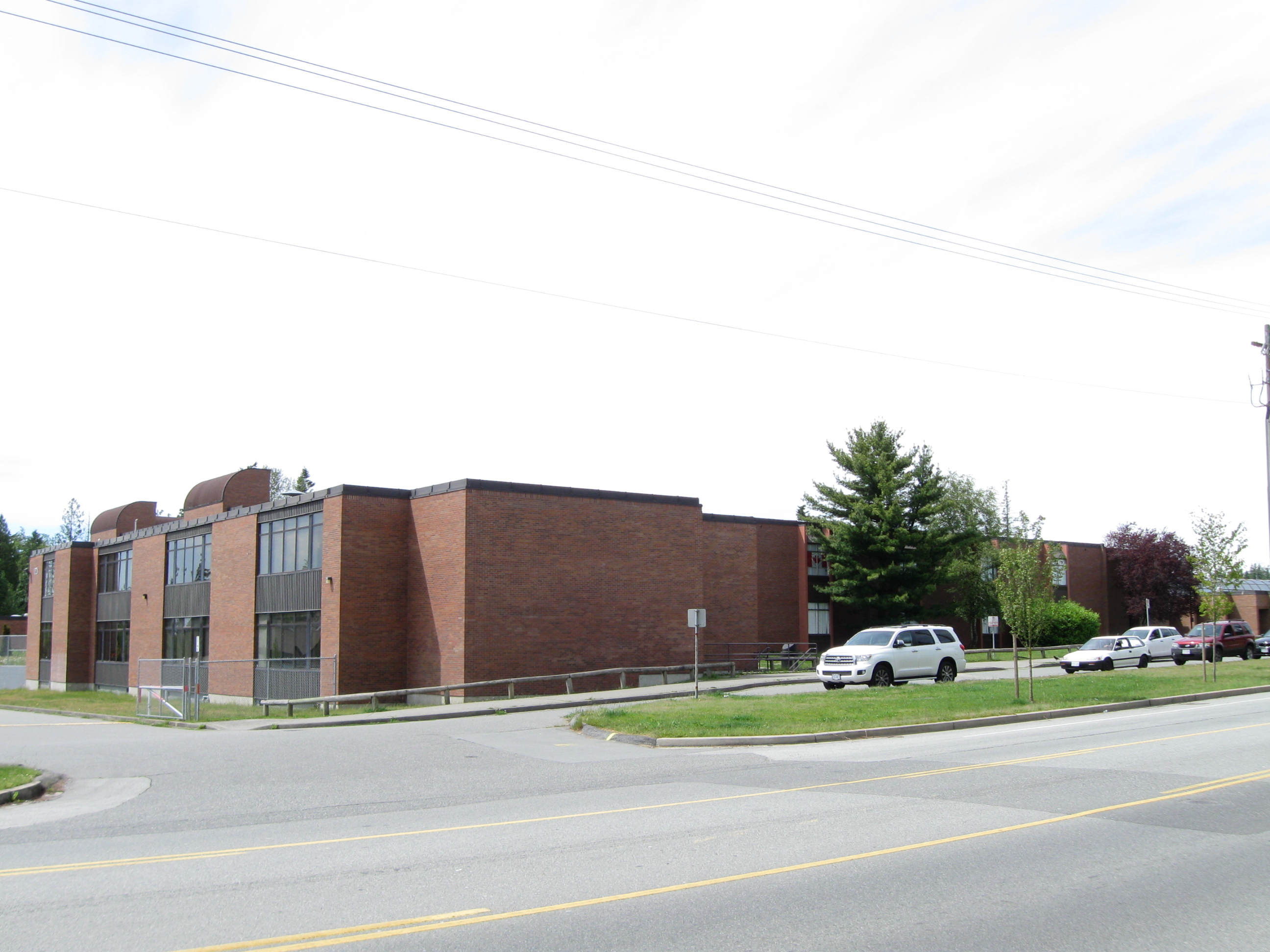
Another view of Semiahmoo Secondary
