= Automorphic =

Automorphic may refer to

- Automorphic number, in mathematics
- Automorphic form, in mathematics
- Automorphic representation, in mathematics
- Automorphic L-function, in mathematics
- Automorphism, in mathematics
- Rock microstructure#Crystal shapes
