= Langlands classification =

Mathematical theory

In mathematics, the Langlands classification is a description of the irreducible representations of a reductive Lie group G, suggested by Robert Langlands (1973). There are two slightly different versions of the Langlands classification. One of these describes the irreducible admissible (g, K)-modules, for g a Lie algebra of a reductive Lie group G, with maximal compact subgroup K, in terms of tempered representations of smaller groups. The tempered representations were in turn classified by Anthony Knapp and Gregg Zuckerman. The other version of the Langlands classification divides the irreducible representations into L-packets, and classifies the L-packets in terms of certain homomorphisms of the Weil group of R or C into the Langlands dual group.

== Notation ==
- g is the Lie algebra of a real reductive Lie group G in the Harish-Chandra class.
- K is a maximal compact subgroup of G, with Lie algebra k.
- ω is a Cartan involution of G, fixing K.
- p is the −1 eigenspace of a Cartan involution of g.
- a is a maximal abelian subspace of p.
- Σ is the root system of a in g.
- Δ is a set of simple roots of Σ.

== Classification ==
The Langlands classification states that the irreducible admissible representations of (g, K) are parameterized by triples

(F, σ, λ)

where

- F is a subset of Δ
- Q is the standard parabolic subgroup of F, with Langlands decomposition Q = MAN
- σ is an irreducible tempered representation of the semisimple Lie group M (up to isomorphism)
- λ is an element of Hom(a_{F}, C) with α(Re(λ)) > 0 for all simple roots α not in F.

More precisely, the irreducible admissible representation given by the data above is the irreducible quotient of a parabolically induced representation.

For an example of the Langlands classification, see the representation theory of SL2(R).

== Variations ==
There are several minor variations of the Langlands classification. For example:

- Instead of taking an irreducible quotient, one can take an irreducible submodule.
- Since tempered representations are in turn given as certain representations induced from discrete series or limit of discrete series representations, one can do both inductions at once and get a Langlands classification parameterized by discrete series or limit of discrete series representations instead of tempered representations. The problem with doing this is that it is tricky to decide when two irreducible representations are the same.
