= L-packet =

Mathematical group representations with same data

In the field of mathematics known as representation theory, an L-packet is a collection of (isomorphism classes of) irreducible representations of a reductive group over a local field, that are L-indistinguishable, meaning they have the same Langlands parameter, and so have the same L-function and ε-factors. L-packets were introduced by Robert Langlands in (Langlands 1989), (Labesse & Langlands 1979).

The classification of irreducible representations splits into two parts: first classify the L-packets, then classify the representations in each L-packet. The local Langlands conjectures state (roughly) that the L-packets of a reductive group G over a local field F are conjecturally parameterized by certain homomorphisms of the Langlands group of F to the L-group of G, and Arthur has given a conjectural description of the representations in a given L-packet.

== The elements of an L-packet ==
For irreducible representations of connected complex reductive groups, Wallach proved that all the L-packets contain just one representation. The L-packets, and therefore the irreducible representations, correspond to quasicharacters of a Cartan subgroup, up to conjugacy under the Weyl group.

For general linear groups over local fields, the L-packets have just one representation in them (up to isomorphism).

An example of an L-packet is the set of discrete series representations with a given infinitesimal character and given central character. For example, the discrete series representations of SL_{2}(R) are grouped into L-packets with two elements.

Arthur (2006) gave a conjectural parameterization of the elements of an L-packet in terms of the connected components of C/Z, where Z is the center of the L-group, and C is the centralizer in the L-group of Im(φ), and φ is the homomorphism of the Langlands group to the L-group corresponding to the L-packet. For example, in the general linear group, the centralizer of any subset is Zariski connected, so the L-packets for the general linear group all have 1 element. On the other hand, the centralizer of a subset of the projective general linear group can have more than 1 component, corresponding to the fact that L-packets for the special linear group can have more than 1 element.
