= Donald John Lewis =

American mathematician

Donald John Lewis (25 January 1926 – 25 February 2015), better known as D.J. Lewis, was an American mathematician specializing in number theory.

Lewis received his PhD in 1950 at the University of Michigan under supervision of Richard Dagobert Brauer, and subsequently was an NSF fellow at the Institute for Advanced Study in Princeton (1952–1953), an NSF senior fellow (1959–1961), a senior visiting fellow at Cambridge University (1965, 1969), a visiting fellow at Oxford University (1976), and Humboldt Awardee (1980, 1983).

He chaired the Department of Mathematics at the University of Michigan (1984–1994), and served as director of the Division of Mathematical Sciences at the National Science Foundation (NSF). He was long active in the American Mathematical Society (AMS), and in 1995 received its Distinguished Public Service Award.
