= Sylvain Cappell =

American mathematician

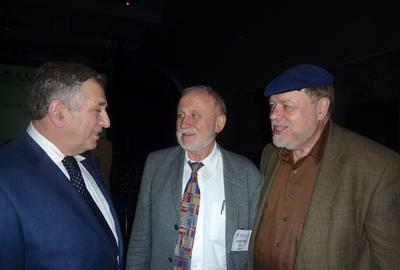
- Sylvain Cappell (right) in 2013
- Born: 1946 (age 79–80); Brussels, Belgium
- Education: Princeton University; Columbia University
- Awards: AMS Distinguished Public Service Award (2018); Guggenheim Fellowship (1989–90); Sloan Fellowship (1971–72)
- Scientific career
- Fields: Mathematics
- Workplaces: New York University
- Doctoral advisor: William Browder
- Doctoral students: Shmuel Weinberger

Sylvain Edward Cappell (born 1946) is a Belgian American mathematician specializing in topology. He is a former student of William Browder at Princeton University and has spent most of his career at the Courant Institute of Mathematical Sciences at New York University, where he is now a Silver Professor of Mathematics.

He was born in Brussels, Belgium and immigrated with his parents to New York City in 1950 and grew up largely in this city. In 1963, as a senior at the Bronx High School of Science, he won first place in the Westinghouse Science Talent Search for his work on "The Theory of Semi-cyclical Groups with Special Reference to Non-Aristotelian Logic." He then graduated from Columbia University in 1966, winning the Van Amringe Mathematical Prize.

In 2012, he became a fellow of the American Mathematical Society (AMS). Cappell served as its vice president from February 2010 until January 2013. He was elected to the American Academy of Arts and Sciences in 2018.
