= Hecke eigensheaf =

Any sheaf whose value is based on an eigenfunction

In mathematics, a Hecke eigensheaf is any sheaf whose value is based on an eigenfunction. It is an object that is a tensor-multiple of itself when formed under the integral transform of a Hecke correspondence. Hecke eigensheaves are part of the geometric Langlands correspondence.
