= Vincent Lafforgue =

French mathematician

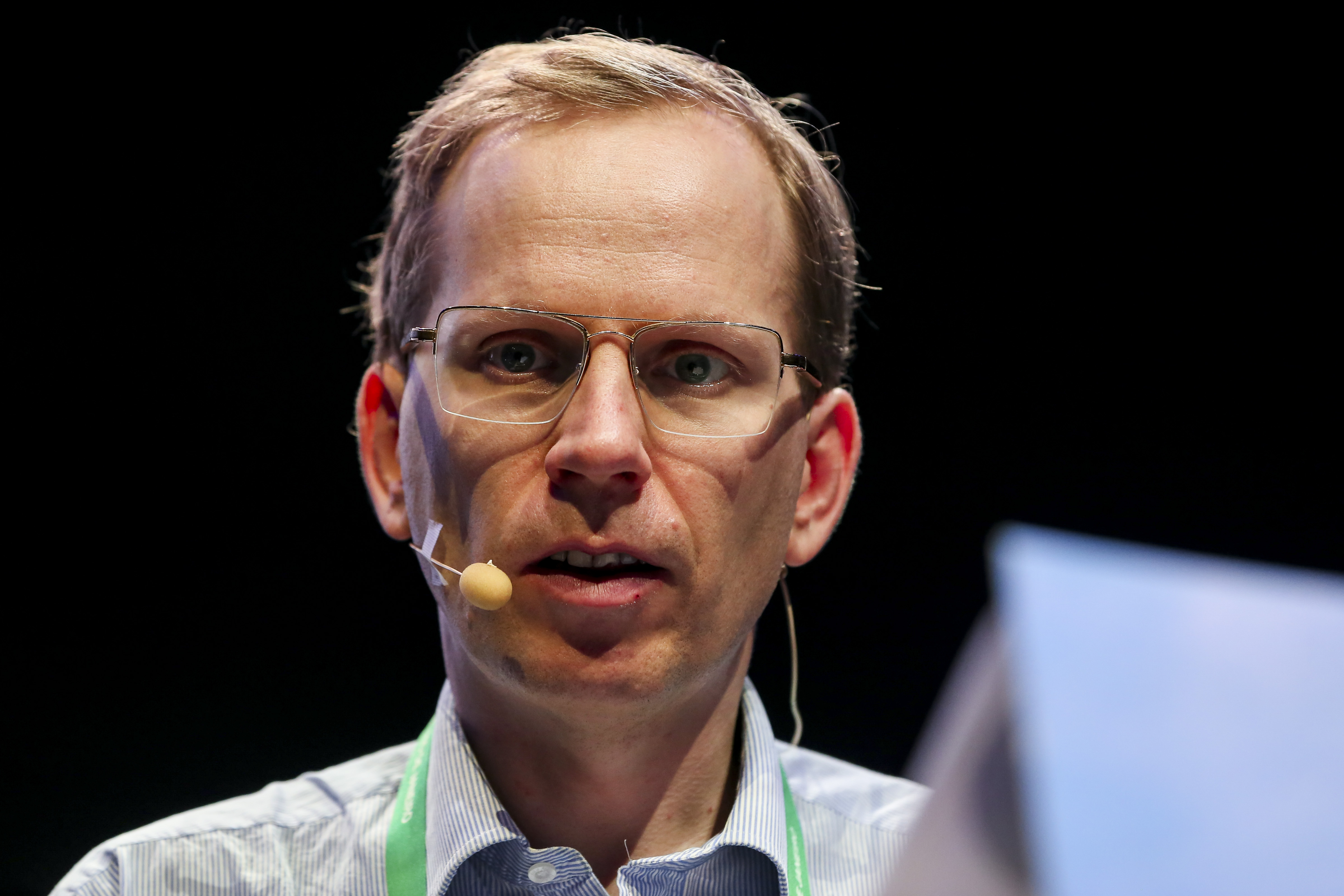
- Lafforgue at the ICM 2018
- Born: 20 January 1974 (age 52); Antony, France
- Education: Lycée Louis-le-Grand
- Alma mater: École normale supérieure University of Paris
- Awards: EMS Prize (2000); CNRS Silver Medal (2015); Breakthrough Prize in Mathematics (2019)
- Scientific career
- Fields: Mathematics
- Institutions: Université Grenoble Alpes
- Doctoral advisor: Jean-Benoît Bost

Vincent Lafforgue (born 20 January 1974) is a French mathematician who is active in algebraic geometry, especially in the Langlands program, and a CNRS "Directeur de Recherches" at the Institute Fourier in Grenoble. He is the younger brother of Fields Medalist Laurent Lafforgue.

== Awards ==
Lafforgue was awarded the 2000 EMS Prize for his contribution to the K-theory of operator algebras: the proof of the Baum–Connes conjecture for discrete co-compact subgroups of $\mathrm{SL}(3,\mathbb{R})$, $\mathrm{SL}(3,\mathbb{C})$, $\mathrm{SL}(3,\mathbb{Q}_p)$ and some other locally compact groups, and of more general objects. He participated in the International Mathematical Olympiad and wrote two perfect papers in 1990 and 1991, making him one of only three French mathematicians to win two gold medals (besides Joseph Najnudel, 1997–98, and Aurélien Fourré, 2020-21). Lafforgue was an Invited Speaker of the ICM in 2002 in Beijing, China and a Plenary Speaker of the ICM in 2018 in Rio de Janeiro, Brazil. He was awarded the 2019 Breakthrough Prize in Mathematics for his "elegant and groundbreaking contributions to the Langlands program in the function field case", namely for establishing the Langlands Correspondence (the direction from automorphic forms to Galois representations) for connected reductive groups defined over global function fields.
