= Ramin Takloo-Bighash =

Iranian mathematician

- Education: Sharif University of Technology; Johns Hopkins University
- Known for: Spinor L-Functions, rational points
- Scientific career
- Fields: Number Theory; Arithmetic Geometry; Harmonic Analysis
- Workplaces: University of Illinois at Chicago; Princeton University
- Doctoral advisor: Joseph Shalika
- Website: http://homepages.math.uic.edu/~rtakloo/

Ramin Takloo-Bighash (born 1974) is a mathematician who works in the field of automorphic forms and Diophantine geometry and is a professor at the University of Illinois at Chicago.

== Mathematical career ==
Takloo-Bighash graduated from the Sharif University of Technology, where he enrolled after winning a Silver medal at the 1992 International Mathematical Olympiad. In 2001, Takloo-Bighash graduated under Joseph Shalika from Johns Hopkins University. He spent 2001-2007 at Princeton University, first as an instructor and then as an assistant professor. He is a professor at the University of Illinois at Chicago.

== Research ==
Takloo-Bighash computed the local factors of spinor L-function attached to generic automorphic forms on the symplectic group GSp(4). He has joint works with Joseph Shalika and Yuri Tschinkel on the distribution of rational points on certain group compactifications. He is a co-author, with Steven J. Miller, of An Invitation To Modern Number Theory (Princeton University Press, 2006).

== Books ==
- Takloo-Bighash, Ramin (2018). A Pythagorean Introduction to Number Theory. Undergraduate Texts in Mathematics. Springer Publishing. p. XVIII, 279. doi:10.1007/978-3-030-02604-2. ISBN 978-3-030-02603-5.
- Miller, Steven; Takloo-Bighash, Ramin (2006). An Invitation to Modern Number Theory. United States: Princeton University Press. p. 526. ISBN 9780691120607.
