= Arthur's conjectures =

Mathematical concept

In mathematics, the Arthur conjectures refer to a set of conjectures proposed by James Arthur in 1989. These conjectures pertain to the properties of automorphic representations of reductive groups over adele rings and the unitary representations of reductive groups over local fields. Arthur’s work, which was motivated by the Arthur–Selberg trace formula, suggests a framework for understanding complex relationships in these areas.

Arthur's conjectures have implications for other mathematical theories, notably implying the generalized Ramanujan conjectures for cusp forms on general linear groups. The Ramanujan conjectures, in turn, are central to the study of automorphic forms, as they predict specific behaviors of certain classes of mathematical functions known as cusp forms.

To better understand the Arthur conjectures, familiarity with automorphic forms and reductive groups is useful, as is knowledge of the trace formula developed by Arthur and Atle Selberg. These mathematical tools allow for analysis of representations of groups in number theory, geometry, and physics.
