= Langlands–Deligne local constant =

Elementary function in mathematics

In number theory, the Langlands–Deligne local constant, named after Robert Langlands and Pierre Deligne, also known as the local epsilon factor, is a function associated with a representation $\rho$ of the Weil group of a local field. The functional equation

$$L(\rho,s) = \varepsilon(\rho,s)L(\rho^v,1-s)$$

of the Artin L-function associated to $\rho$ has a function $\varepsilon(\rho,s)$ appearing in it, equal to a constant called the Artin root number times an elementary real function of $s$, and Langlands discovered that $\varepsilon(\rho,s)$ can be written in a canonical way as a product

$$\varepsilon(\rho,s) = \prod \varepsilon(\rho_v,s,\psi_v)$$

of local constants $\varepsilon(\rho_v,s,\psi_v)$ associated to primes $v$.

In his thesis, John Tate proved the existence of the local constants in the case that $\rho$ is one-dimensional. Bernard Dwork proved the existence of the local constant $\varepsilon(\rho_v,s,\psi_v)$ up to sign. The original proof of the existence of the local constants by Langlands (1970) used local methods and was rather long and complicated, and never published. Deligne later discovered a simpler proof using global methods.

== Properties ==
The local constants $\varepsilon(\rho,s,\psi_v)$ depend on a representation $\rho$ of the Weil group and a choice of character $\psi_E$ of the additive group of $E$. They satisfy the following conditions:

- If $\rho$ is one-dimensional then $\varepsilon(\rho,s,\psi_E)$ is the constant associated to it by Tate's thesis as the constant in the functional equation of the local L-function.
- $\varepsilon(\rho_1\oplus\rho_2,s,\psi_E) = \varepsilon(\rho_1,s,\psi_E)\varepsilon(\rho_2,s,\psi_E).$As a result, $\varepsilon(\rho,s,\psi_E)$ can also be defined for virtual representations $\rho$.
- If $\rho$ is a virtual representation of dimension 0 and $E$ contains $K$ then $\varepsilon(\rho,s,\psi_E) = \varepsilon(\operatorname{Ind}_{E/K} \rho, s, \psi_K)$.

Brauer's theorem on induced characters implies that these three properties characterize the local constants.

Deligne showed that the local constants are trivial for real (orthogonal) representations of the Weil group.

== Notational conventions ==
There are several different conventions for denoting the local constants.

- The parameter $s$ is redundant and can be combined with the representation $\rho$, because ε(ρ, s, ψ_{E}) = ε(ρ⊗||^{s}, 0, ψ_{E}) for a suitable character ||.
- Deligne includes an extra parameter $dx$ consisting of a choice of Haar measure on the local field. Other conventions omit this parameter by fixing a choice of Haar measure: either the Haar measure that is self dual with respect to $\psi$ (used by Langlands), or the Haar measure that gives the integers of $E$ measure 1. These different conventions differ by elementary terms that are positive real numbers.
