= AMS Distinguished Public Service Award =

- Description: Award recognizing a research mathematician who has made a distinguished contribution to the mathematics profession during the preceding five years
- Country: United States
- Presented by: American Mathematical Society
- Website: http://www.ams.org/profession/prizes-awards/ams-awards/public-service-award

The AMS Distinguished Public Service Award, awarded every 2 years by the American Mathematical Society, recognizes a research mathematician who has made a distinguished contribution to the mathematics profession during the preceding five years. It was first awarded in 1990.

== Recipients ==
The recipients of the AMS Distinguished Public Service Award are:

- 1990: Kenneth M. Hoffman
- 1991: No award
- 1992: Harvey B. Keynes
- 1993: I. M. Singer
- 1995: Donald J. Lewis
- 1997: No award made
- 1998: Kenneth C. Millett
- 2000: Paul J. Sally, Jr.
- 2002: Margaret H. Wright
- 2004: Richard A. Tapia
- 2006: Roger Howe
- 2008: Herbert Clemens
- 2010: Carlos Castillo-Chavez
- 2012: William McCallum
- 2014: Philip Kutzko
- 2016: Aloysius Helminck
- 2018: Sylvain Cappell
- 2020: David Eisenbud
- 2022: Rodrigo Bañuelos
- 2024: Angel Pineda
- 2026: Wilfrid Gangbo

== See also ==
- List of mathematics awards
