= Jacquet module =

In mathematics, the Jacquet module is a module used in the study of automorphic representations. The Jacquet functor is the functor that sends a linear representation to its Jacquet module. They are both named after Hervé Jacquet.

== Definition ==
The Jacquet module J(V) of a representation (π,V) of a group N is the space of co-invariants of N; or in other words the largest quotient of V on which N acts trivially, or the zeroth homology group H_{0}(N,V). In other words, it is the quotient V/V_{N} where V_{N} is the subspace of V generated by elements of the form π(n)v - v for all n in N and all v in V.

The Jacquet functor J is the functor taking V to its Jacquet module J(V).

== Applications ==
Jacquet modules are used to classify admissible irreducible representations of a reductive algebraic group G over a local field, and N is the unipotent radical of a parabolic subgroup of G. In the case of p-adic groups, they were studied by Hervé Jacquet (1971).

For the general linear group GL(2), the Jacquet module of an admissible irreducible representation has dimension at most two. If the dimension is zero, then the representation is called a supercuspidal representation. If the dimension is one, then the representation is a special representation. If the dimension is two, then the representation is a principal series representation.
