= Steven J. Miller =

American mathematician

Steven Joel Miller
- Education: Yale University; Princeton University
- Scientific career
- Fields: Mathematics
- Workplaces: Williams College; Smith College; Mount Holyoke College; Brown University; Boston University; Ohio State University; American Institute of Mathematics; NYU; Princeton University
- Thesis: 1 and 2 Level Densities for Families of Elliptic Curves: Evidence for the Underlying Group Symmetries (2002)
- Doctoral advisors: Peter Sarnak; Henryk Iwaniec
- Website: web.williams.edu/Mathematics/sjmiller/public_html/

Steven Joel Miller is a mathematician who specializes in analytic number theory and has also worked in applied fields such as sabermetrics and linear programming. He is a co-author, with Ramin Takloo-Bighash, of An Invitation to Modern Number Theory (Princeton University Press, 2006), with Midge Cozzens of The Mathematics of Encryption: An Elementary Introduction (AMS Mathematical World series 29, Providence, RI, 2013), and with Stephan Ramon Garcia of 100 Years of Math Milestones: The Pi Mu Epsilon Centennial Collection (American Mathematical Society, 2019). He also edited Theory and Applications of Benford's Law (Princeton University Press, 2015) and wrote The Mathematics of Optimization: How to do things faster (AMS Pure and Applied Undergraduate Texts Volume: 30; 2017) and The Probability Lifesaver: All the Tools You Need to Understand Chance (Princeton University Press, 2017). He has written over 100 papers in topics including accounting, Benford's law, computer science, economics, marketing, mathematics, physics, probability, sabermetrics, and statistics, available on the arXiv and his homepage.

== Academic career ==
Miller earned his B.S. in mathematics and physics at Yale University and completed his graduate studies in mathematics at Princeton University in 2002. His Ph.D. thesis, titled "1 and 2 Level Densities for Families of Elliptic Curves: Evidence for the Underlying Group Symmetries," was written under the direction of Peter Sarnak and Henryk Iwaniec. He is currently a professor of mathematics at Williams College, where he has served as the Director of the Williams SMALL REU Program and is currently the faculty president of the Williams Phi Beta Kappa chapter. He's also a faculty fellow at the Erdos Institute.

He was included in the 2019 class of fellows of the American Mathematical Society "for contributions to number theory and service to the mathematical community, particularly in support of mentoring undergraduate research".

== Books ==
Miller has published six books.

- 100 Years of Math Milestones: The Pi Mu Epsilon Centennial Collection (with Stephan Ramon Garcia): https://bookstore.ams.org/mbk-121
- Benford's Law: Theory and Applications (editor): https://press.princeton.edu/books/hardcover/9780691147611/benfords-law
- An Invitation to Modern Number Theory (with Ramin Takloo-Bighash): https://press.princeton.edu/books/hardcover/9780691120607/an-invitation-to-modern-number-theory
- The Mathematics of Encryption: An Elementary Introduction (with Margaret Cozzens): https://bookstore.ams.org/mawrld-29
- Mathematics of Optimization: How to do Things Faster: https://bookstore.ams.org/amstext-30/
- The Probability Lifesaver: All the Tools You Need to Understand Chance: https://press.princeton.edu/books/hardcover/9780691149547/the-probability-lifesaver

== Controversies ==
In the aftermath of the 2020 United States presidential election Miller performed a statistical analysis of the integrity of mail in voting in Pennsylvania. The data underlying the analysis was collected by former Trump staffer Matt Braynard's Voter Integrity Fund. The data was collected by calling 20,000 Republican voters in Pennsylvania who, according to state records, had requested but not returned ballots. Of the 20,000 called 2,684 agreed to take the survey, which found that 463 reported that they actually had mailed in a ballot and 556 reported that they had not requested a ballot in the first place.

In Miller's statement to the court - Exhibit A of Donald J. Trump for President v. Boockvar - he stated: "I estimate that with a reasonable degree of mathematical certainty (based on the data I received being accurate and a representative sample of the population) the number of the 165,412 mail-in ballots requested by someone other than the registered Republican is at least 37,000, and the number of the 165,412 mail-in ballots requested by registered Republicans and returned but not counted is at least 38,910 ... The analysis is based on responses from a data set drawn from 165,412 registered Republican voters who had a mail-in ballot requested in their name but not counted in the election. We estimate on the order of 41,000 of these ballots were requested by someone other than the proper voter. Who made such requests, and why? One possible explanation is that ballots were requested by others. Another possible explanation is that a large number of people requested ballots and forgot they did so later. Again, the conclusions above are based on the data provided being both accurate and a representative sample."

Miller's statement drew sharp criticism from his peers, centered on the low response rate of phone surveys yielding unrepresentive data upon which Miller's estimates were based. Miller apologized for the "lack of clarity and due diligence" in a leaked early draft of his work. Richard D. De Veaux, Vice President of the American Statistical Association and Professor of Statistics at Williams College, commented "any estimates based on unverifiable or biased data are inaccurate, wrong and unfounded. To apply naïve statistical formulas to biased data and publish this is both irresponsible and unethical".

In interviews Miller has gone on the record about being a conservative.

== Research Experiences for Undergraduates ==
Miller has continuously run summer research groups in, among other topics, Benford's law, combinatorics, discrete geometry, number theory, probability, and random matrix theory at Williams College as part of the SMALL REU (Research Experiences for Undergraduates).

In 2020 with several colleagues, in response to the loss of opportunities for student research due to many summer programs being cancelled due to covid, he helped create the Polymath REU. The program has been supported by the National Science Foundation and Elsevier. From its homepage: Our goal is to provide research opportunities to every undergraduate who wishes to explore advanced mathematics. The program consists of research projects in a variety of mathematical topics and runs in the spirit of the Polymath Project. Each project is mentored by an active researcher with experience in undergraduate mentoring. Each project consists of 20-30 undergraduates, a main mentor, and additional mentors (usually graduate students). This group works towards solving a research problem and writing a paper. Each participant decides what they wish to obtain from the program, and participates accordingly.

Students interested in either program should apply through Math Programs.

== College Courses ==
Starting in 2014, and consistently from 2016 onward, Miller has recorded his courses and made them freely available through YouTube. Below is a subset; the complete list, including different iterations of each course, is available at his homepage.

- Advanced Applied Analysis: Math 466: https://web.williams.edu/Mathematics/sjmiller/public_html/466Fa17/index.htm
- Advanced Applied Linear Programming: Math 416: https://web.williams.edu/Mathematics/sjmiller/public_html/416/index.htm
- Advanced Analysis: Math 389: https://web.williams.edu/Mathematics/sjmiller/public_html/389/index.htm
- Applied Analysis: Math 317 (Operations Research): https://web.williams.edu/Mathematics/sjmiller/public_html/317/index.htm
- Complex Analysis: Math 383: https://web.williams.edu/Mathematics/sjmiller/public_html/383Fa21/
- Multivariable Calculus: Math 150: http://web.williams.edu/Mathematics/sjmiller/public_html/150Sp21/
- Number Theory: Math 313: https://web.williams.edu/Mathematics/sjmiller/public_html/313Sp17/index.htm
- Operations Research: Math 317: https://web.williams.edu/Mathematics/sjmiller/public_html/317Fa19/
- Probability: Math/Stat 341: https://web.williams.edu/Mathematics/sjmiller/public_html/341Fa21/
- Problem Solving: Math 331: http://web.williams.edu/Mathematics/sjmiller/public_html/331Fa18/
