= Philip Kutzko =

American mathematician (born 1946)

- Born: November 24, 1946 (age 79)
- Education: University of Wisconsin–Madison
- Known for: Works on Langlands program
- Awards: AMS Distinguished Public Service Award (2014)
- Scientific career
- Fields: Mathematics
- Workplaces: University of Iowa
- Doctoral advisor: Donald McQuillan

Philip Caesar Kutzko (born November 24, 1946) is a prominent American mathematician recognized for his contributions to the field of representation theory, particularly in the context of the Langlands program. He has also lead very successful initiatives aimed at increasing diversity in graduate mathematics programs.

== Education and career ==
Kutzko studied mathematics at the City College of New York, earning a BS degree in 1967. Then at the University of Wisconsin–Madison he got an MS in 1968 and a PhD in 1972, under the supervision of Donald McQuillan for his thesis "The Characters of Binary-Modular Congruence Groups."

Then as a postdoctoral fellow, he went to Princeton University where he became an instructor in 1972, an assistant professor in 1974, an associate professor in 1977, and a full professor in 1977. In 1980 he went to the University of Iowa (U of I) where he was a full professor until he retired in 2017.

He had a distinguished career at U of I, contributing both to mathematics, particularly in representation theory, and to initiatives aimed at increasing diversity in graduate mathematics programs. His work in promoting inclusivity in mathematics earned him considerable recognition, complementing his research achievements.

== Work ==
In 1980, Kutzko proved the local Langlands conjectures for the general linear group GL_{2}(K) over local fields. In 2014, he became a Fellow of the American Mathematical Society "for contributions to representations of p-adic groups and the local Langlands program, as well as for recruitment and mentoring of under-represented minority students."

In 1986 he was an invited speaker at the International Congress of Mathematicians in Berkeley with a talk "On the supercuspidal representations of GL_{2}".

His research has had a profound influence on representation theory, particularly through his work on the representation theory of p-adic groups.

== Awards ==
- 2014 AMS Distinguished Public Service Award (2014)
- 2008 Presidential Award for Excellence in Science, Mathematics and Engineering Mentoring
- 2004 Presidential Award for Excellence in Science, Mathematics and Engineering Mentoring
