= Guy Henniart =

French mathematician (born 1953)

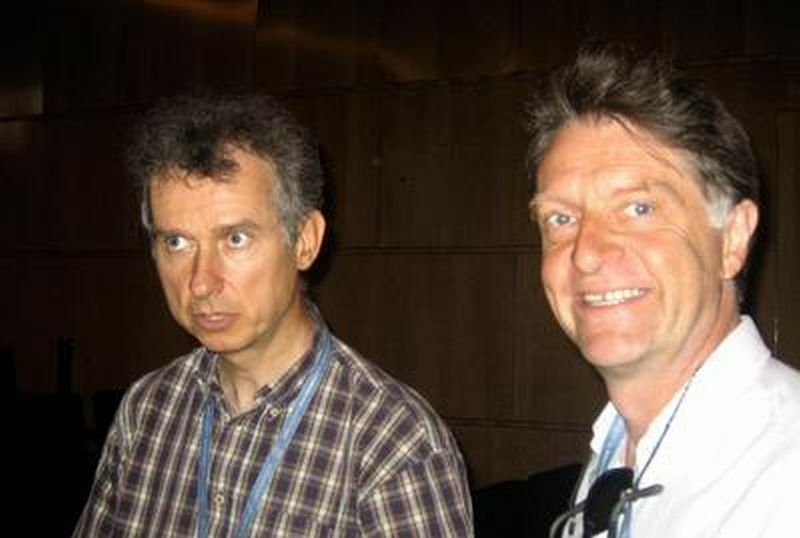
Henniart (right) with Jean-François Le Gall at the 2006 ICM in Madrid, Spain.

Guy Henniart (born 1953, Santes) is a French mathematician at Paris-Sud 11 University. He is known for his contributions to the Langlands program, in particular his proof of the local Langlands conjecture for GL(n) over a p-adic local field—independently from Michael Harris and Richard Taylor—in 2000.

Henniart attained his doctorate from the University of Paris V in 1978, under supervision of Pierre Cartier with thesis Représentations du groupe de Weil d’un corps local. He was a member of Nicolas Bourbaki. Henniart was an invited speaker at the International Congress of Mathematicians in 2006 at Madrid and gave a talk On the local Langlands and Jacquet-Langlands correspondences.

== Selected publications ==
- La conjecture de Langlands locale pour GL(3). Mémoires de la Société Mathématique de France. Vol. 11–12. Gauthier-Villars. 1984.
- Henniart, Guy (2000). "Une preuve simple des conjectures de Langlands pour GL(n) sur un corps p-adique". Inventiones Mathematicae. 139 (2): 439–455. Bibcode:2000InMat.139..439H. doi:10.1007/s002220050012. S2CID 120799103.
- with Colin Bushnell: The local Langlands conjecture for GL(2). Grundlehren der mathematischen Wissenschaften. Vol. 335. Springer-Verlag. 2006. ISBN 3-540-31486-5.
