= William G. McCallum =

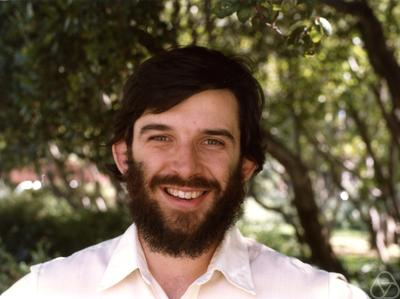
- McCallum, 1984
- Born: 1956 (age 69–70); Sydney, Australia
- Occupations: Mathematician, professor
- Known for: Led the development of the Common Core standards for mathematics
- Title: Distinguished Professor
- Board member of: Harvard Calculus Consortium, founder; Illustrative Mathematics, founder
- Awards: American Mathematical Society (Fellow, 2012); Mary P. Dolciani Award (2012); AMS Distinguished Public Service Award (2012)

Academic background
- Education: Harvard University
- Thesis: On the Shafarevich-Tate group of the jacobian of a quotient of the Fermat curvature (1988)
- Doctoral advisor: Barry Mazur

Academic work
- Discipline: Mathematics
- Institutions: University of Arizona (1987-2018)

William G. McCallum (born 1956 in Sydney, Australia) is a retired University Distinguished Professor of Mathematics at the University of Arizona. His professional interests include arithmetical algebraic geometry and mathematics education.

== Education and professional work ==
McCallum received a bachelor's degree from the University of New South Wales in 1977, and his Ph.D. in Mathematics from Harvard University in 1984, under the supervision of Barry Mazur.

He was a postdoctoral researcher at the University of California, Berkeley and the Mathematical Sciences Research Institute in Berkeley before joining the University of Arizona in 1987. He became University Distinguished Professor from 2006 until his retirement in 2018, and headed the Department of Mathematics from 2009 to 2013.

McCallum helped found the Harvard Calculus Consortium with other mathematicians including Andrew M. Gleason and Deborah Hughes Hallett. He led the development of the Common Core standards for mathematics from 2009 until the standards were first released in 2010. In 2014 he founded a company, eventually known as Illustrative Mathematics, to develop teaching resources for the mathematics standards that he helped develop.

== Selected honors and awards ==
In 2012, McCallum became a Fellow of the American Mathematical Society. In the same year he received the inaugural Mary P. Dolciani Award for distinguished contributions to mathematical education, administered by the Mathematical Association of America, and the AMS Distinguished Public Service Award of the American Mathematical Society, "for his energetic and effective efforts in promoting improvements to mathematics education"
