= Cristina Ballantine =

Mathematician

Cristina Maria Ballantine is a mathematician whose interests include number theory, algebraic combinatorics, representation theory, and the theory of buildings. Born in Romania and educated in Germany and Canada, she works in the US as Distinguished Professor of Science at the College of the Holy Cross in Worcester, Massachusetts.

== Education and career ==
Ballantine is originally from Transylvania, in Romania, and grew up in Bucharest. She earned a diploma at the University of Stuttgart in Germany in 1988. She went to the University of Toronto in Canada for graduate study in mathematics, earning a master's degree in 1992 and completing her Ph.D. in 1998. Her dissertation, Hypergraphs and Automorphic Forms, was supervised by James Arthur, a specialist on automorphic forms.

She held short-term postdoctoral positions at the University of Wyoming, Bowdoin College, and Dartmouth College before joining the College of the Holy Cross as an assistant professor in 2002. She visited the University of Münster in Germany in 2004–2005 as a Fulbright scholar, was promoted to associate professor in 2007, and became full professor in 2014. She held the Anthony and Renee Marlon Professorship in the Sciences from 2018 to 2021, and became Distinguished Professor of Science in 2021.
