= Albrecht Fröhlich =

British mathematician

Albrecht Fröhlich FRS
- Born: 22 May 1916; Munich, German Empire
- Died: 8 November 2001 (aged 85); Cambridge, England, United Kingdom
- Education: University of Bristol
- Awards: De Morgan Medal (1992); Berwick Prize (1976)
- Scientific career
- Fields: Mathematics
- Workplaces: University of London
- Doctoral advisor: Hans Heilbronn; J. G. Mostyn
- Doctoral students: Colin Bushnell; Martin J. Taylor

Albrecht Fröhlich FRS (22 May 1916 – 8 November 2001) was a German-born British mathematician, famous for his major results and conjectures on Galois module theory in the Galois structure of rings of integers.

== Education ==
He was born in Munich to a Jewish family. He fled from the Nazis to France, and then to Palestine. He went to Bristol University in 1945, gaining a B.Sc. in 1948 and a Ph.D. in 1951 with a dissertation entitled On Some Topics in the Theory of Representation of Groups and Individual Class Field Theory under the supervision of Hans Heilbronn. He was a lecturer at the University of Leicester and then at the Keele University, then in 1962 moved as reader to King's College London where he worked until his retirement in 1981 when he moved to Robinson College, Cambridge.

== Awards ==
He was elected a Fellow of the Royal Society in 1976. He was awarded the Berwick Prize of the London Mathematical Society in 1976 and its De Morgan Medal in 1992. The Society's Fröhlich Prize is named in his honour.

== Personal ==
He is the brother of Herbert Fröhlich.
