= Jacquet–Langlands correspondence =

In mathematics, the Jacquet–Langlands correspondence is a correspondence between automorphic forms on GL_{2} and its twisted forms, proved by Jacquet and Langlands (1970, section 16) in their book Automorphic Forms on GL(2) using the Selberg trace formula. It was one of the first examples of the Langlands philosophy that maps between L-groups should induce maps between automorphic representations. There are generalized versions of the Jacquet–Langlands correspondence relating automorphic representations of GL_{r}(D) and GL_{dr}(F), where D is a division algebra of degree d^{2} over the local or global field F.

Suppose that G is an inner twist of the algebraic group GL_{2}, in other words the multiplicative group of a quaternion algebra. The Jacquet–Langlands correspondence is bijection between

- Automorphic representations of G of dimension greater than 1
- Cuspidal automorphic representations of GL_{2} that are square integrable (modulo the center) at each ramified place of G.

Corresponding representations have the same local components at all unramified places of G.

Rogawski (1983) and Deligne, Kazhdan & Vignéras (1984) extended the Jacquet–Langlands correspondence to division algebras of higher dimension.
