= Automorphic L-function =

Mathematical concept

In mathematics, an automorphic L-function is a function L(s,π,r) of a complex variable s, associated to an automorphic representation π of a reductive group G over a global field and a finite-dimensional complex representation r of the Langlands dual group ^{L}G of G, generalizing the Dirichlet L-series of a Dirichlet character and the Mellin transform of a modular form. They were introduced by Langlands (1967, 1970, 1971).

Borel (1979) and Arthur & Gelbart (1991) gave surveys of automorphic L-functions.

== Properties ==
Automorphic $L$-functions should have the following properties (which have been proved in some cases but are still conjectural in other cases).

The L-function $L(s, \pi, r)$ should be a product over the places $v$ of $F$ of local $L$ functions.

$L(s, \pi, r) = \prod_v L(s, \pi_v, r_v)$

Here the automorphic representation $\pi = \otimes\pi_v$ is a tensor product of the representations $\pi_v$ of local groups.

The L-function is expected to have an analytic continuation as a meromorphic function of all complex $s$, and satisfy a functional equation

$L(s, \pi, r) = \epsilon(s, \pi, r) L(1 - s, \pi, r^\lor)$

where the factor $\epsilon(s, \pi, r)$ is a product of "local constants"

$\epsilon(s, \pi, r) = \prod_v \epsilon(s, \pi_v, r_v, \psi_v)$

almost all of which are 1.

== General linear groups ==
Godement & Jacquet (1972) constructed the automorphic L-functions for general linear groups with r the standard representation (so-called standard L-functions) and verified analytic continuation and the functional equation, by using a generalization of the method in Tate's thesis. Ubiquitous in the Langlands Program are Rankin-Selberg products of representations of GL(m) and GL(n). The resulting Rankin-Selberg L-functions satisfy a number of analytic properties, their functional equation being first proved via the Langlands–Shahidi method.

In general, the Langlands functoriality conjectures imply that automorphic L-functions of a connected reductive group are equal to products of automorphic L-functions of general linear groups. A proof of Langlands functoriality would also lead towards a thorough understanding of the analytic properties of automorphic L-functions.

== See also ==
- Grand Riemann hypothesis
