= Ulrich Stuhler =

German mathematician

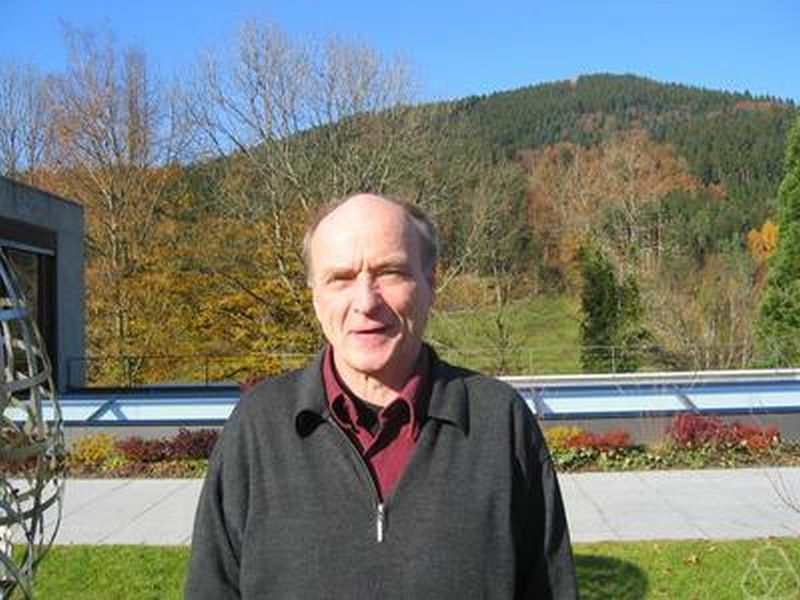
- Stuhler in Oberwolfach, 2007.
- Education: University of Göttingen
- Known for: Works on Langlands program
- Scientific career
- Fields: Mathematics
- Workplaces: University of Göttingen
- Doctoral advisor: Martin Kneser

Ulrich Stuhler is a German mathematician. He currently is a professor at the University of Göttingen. He is known for his contributions to the Langlands program. In 1993, he—along with Gérard Laumon and Michael Rapoport—proved the local Langlands conjectures for the general linear group GL_{n}(K) for positive characteristic local fields K.

An alumnus of the University of Göttingen, Stuhler earned his doctorate under supervision of Martin Kneser in 1970.
