= Arthur–Selberg trace formula =

In mathematics, the Arthur–Selberg trace formula is a generalization of the Selberg trace formula from the group SL_{2} to arbitrary reductive groups over global fields, developed by James Arthur in a long series of papers from 1974 to 2003. It describes the character of the representation of G(A) on the discrete part L^{2}_{0}(G(F)\G(A)) of L^{2}(G(F)\G(A)) in terms of geometric data, where G is a reductive algebraic group defined over a global field F and A is the ring of adeles of F.

There are several different versions of the trace formula. The first version was the unrefined trace formula, whose terms depend on truncation operators and have the disadvantage that they are not invariant. Arthur later found the invariant trace formula and the stable trace formula which are more suitable for applications. The simple trace formula (Flicker & Kazhdan 1988) is less general but easier to prove. The local trace formula is an analogue over local fields. Jacquet's relative trace formula is a generalization where one integrates the kernel function over non-diagonal subgroups.

== Notation ==
- F is a global field, such as the field of rational numbers.
- A is the ring of adeles of F.
- G is a reductive algebraic group defined over F.

== The compact case ==
In the case when G(F)\G(A) is compact the representation splits as a direct sum of irreducible representations, and the trace formula is similar to the Frobenius formula for the character of the representation induced from the trivial representation of a subgroup of finite index.

In the compact case, which is essentially due to Selberg, the groups G(F) and G(A) can be replaced by any discrete subgroup Γ of a locally compact group G with Γ\G compact. The group G acts on the space of functions on Γ\G by the right regular representation R, and this extends to an action of the group ring of G, considered as the ring of functions f on G. The character of this representation is given by a generalization of the Frobenius formula as follows. The action of a function f on a function φ on Γ\G is given by

$$\displaystyle R(f)(\phi)(x) = \int_G f(y)\phi(xy) \,dy = \int_{\Gamma\backslash G}\sum_{\gamma\in \Gamma}f(x^{-1}\gamma y)\phi(y)\,dy.$$

In other words, R(f) is an integral operator on L^{2}(Γ\G) (the space of functions on Γ\G) with kernel

$$\displaystyle K_f(x,y) = \sum_{\gamma\in \Gamma}f(x^{-1}\gamma y).$$

Therefore, the trace of R(f) is given by

$$\displaystyle \operatorname{Tr}(R(f)) = \int_{\Gamma\backslash G}K_f(x,x) \,dx.$$

The kernel K can be written as

$$K_f(x,y) = \sum_{o\in O}K_o(x,y)$$

where O is the set of conjugacy classes in Γ, and

$$K_o(x,y)= \sum_{\gamma\in o}f(x^{-1}\gamma y) = \sum_{\delta\in \Gamma_\gamma\backslash \Gamma}f(x^{-1}\delta^{-1}\gamma\delta y)$$

where $\gamma$ is an element of the conjugacy class $o$, and $\Gamma_\gamma$ is its centralizer in $\Gamma$.

On the other hand, the trace is also given by

$$\displaystyle \operatorname{Tr}(R(f)) = \sum_{\pi} m(\pi)\operatorname{Tr}(f(\pi))$$

where $m(\pi)$ is the multiplicity of the irreducible unitary representation $\pi$ of $G$ in $L^2(\Gamma \backslash G)$ and $f(\pi)$ is the operator on the space of $\pi$ given by $\int_G f(y)\pi(y) dy$.

=== Examples ===
- If Γ and G are both finite, the trace formula is equivalent to the Frobenius formula for the character of an induced representation.
- If G is the group R of real numbers and Γ the subgroup Z of integers, then the trace formula becomes the Poisson summation formula.

=== Difficulties in the non-compact case ===
In most cases of the Arthur–Selberg trace formula, the quotient G(F)\G(A) is not compact, which causes the following (closely related) problems:

- The representation on L^{2}(G(F)\G(A)) contains not only discrete components, but also continuous components.
- The kernel is no longer integrable over the diagonal, and the operators R(f) are no longer of trace class.

Arthur dealt with these problems by truncating the kernel at cusps in such a way that the truncated kernel is integrable over the diagonal. This truncation process causes many problems; for example, the truncated terms are no longer invariant under conjugation. By manipulating the terms further, Arthur was able to produce an invariant trace formula whose terms are invariant.

The original Selberg trace formula studied a discrete subgroup Γ of a real Lie group G(R) (usually SL_{2}(R)). In higher rank it is more convenient to replace the Lie group with an adelic group G(A). One reason for this that the discrete group can be taken as the group of points G(F) for F a (global) field, which is easier to work with than discrete subgroups of Lie groups. It also makes Hecke operators easier to work with.

== The trace formula in the non-compact case ==
One version of the trace formula (Arthur 1983) asserts the equality of two distributions on G(A):

$$\sum_{o\in O}J_o^T = \sum_{\chi\in X}J_\chi^T.$$

The left hand side is the geometric side of the trace formula, and is a sum over equivalence classes in the group of rational points G(F) of G, while the right hand side is the spectral side of the trace formula and is a sum over certain representations of subgroups of G(A).

== The invariant trace formula ==
The version of the trace formula above is not particularly easy to use in practice, one of the problems being that the terms in it are not invariant under conjugation. Arthur (1981) found a modification in which the terms are invariant.

The invariant trace formula states

$$\sum_M\frac{|W_0^M|}{|W_0^G|} \sum_{\gamma\in (M(Q))}a^M(\gamma)I_M(\gamma,f)
= \sum_M\frac{|W_0^M|}{|W_0^G|} \int_{\Pi(M)}a^M(\pi)I_M(\pi,f) \, d\pi$$

where

- f is a test function on G(A)
- M ranges over a finite set of rational Levi subgroups of G
- (M(Q)) is the set of conjugacy classes of M(Q)
- Π(M) is the set of irreducible unitary representations of M(A)
- a^{M}(γ) is related to the volume of M(Q,γ)\M(A,γ)
- a^{M}(π) is related to the multiplicity of the irreducible representation π in L^{2}(M(Q)\M(A))
- $\displaystyle I_M(\gamma,f)$ is related to $\displaystyle\int_{M(A,\gamma)\backslash M(A)}f(x^{-1}\gamma x) \, dx$
- $\displaystyle I_M(\pi,f)$ is related to trace $\displaystyle \int_{M(A)}f(x) \pi(x) \, dx$
- W_{0}(M) is the Weyl group of M.

== Stable trace formula ==
Langlands (1983) suggested the possibility a stable refinement of the trace formula that can be used to compare the trace formula for two different groups. Such a stable trace formula was found and proved by Arthur (2002).

Two elements of a group G(F) are called stably conjugate if they are conjugate over the algebraic closure of the field F. The point is that when one compares elements in two different groups, related for example by inner twisting, one does not usually get a good correspondence between conjugacy classes, but only between stable conjugacy classes. So to compare the geometric terms in the trace formulas for two different groups, one would like the terms to be not just invariant under conjugacy, but also to be well behaved on stable conjugacy classes; these are called stable distributions.

The stable trace formula writes the terms in the trace formula of a group G in terms of stable distributions. However these stable distributions are not distributions on the group G, but are distributions on a family of quasisplit groups called the endoscopic groups of G. Unstable orbital integrals on the group G correspond to stable orbital integrals on its endoscopic groups H.

== Simple trace formula ==
There are several simple forms of the trace formula, which restrict the compactly supported test functions f in some way (Flicker & Kazhdan 1988). The advantage of this is that the trace formula and its proof become much easier, and the disadvantage is that the resulting formula is less powerful.

For example, if the functions f are cuspidal, which means that

$$\int_{n\in N(A)}f(xny) \, dn=0$$

for any unipotent radical N of a proper parabolic subgroup (defined over F) and any x, y in G(A), then the operator R(f) has image in the space of cusp forms so is compact.

== Applications ==
Jacquet & Langlands (1970) used the Selberg trace formula to prove the Jacquet–Langlands correspondence between automorphic forms on GL_{2} and its twisted forms. The Arthur–Selberg trace formula can be used to study similar correspondences on higher rank groups. It can also be used to prove several other special cases of Langlands functoriality, such as base change, for some groups.

Kottwitz (1988) used the Arthur–Selberg trace formula to prove the Weil conjecture on Tamagawa numbers.

Lafforgue (2002) described how the trace formula is used in his proof of the Langlands conjecture for general linear groups over function fields.

== See also ==
- Maass wave form
- Harmonic Maass form
- Arthur's conjectures
