= Donald McQuillan =

Irish mathematician

Donald McQuillan (February 24, 1934 - January 4, 2025) was an Irish mathematician. During his career in mathematics he specialized in the areas of algebra and number theory. Following his retirement from teaching and research, he worked in university quality assurance in Ireland and internationally.

== Education ==
McQuillan was born in Dundalk, Ireland in 1934, where he attended the all-Irish Christian Brothers school. He was awarded the Aiken scholarship at Galway University, where he received his Bachelor in Mathematical Science in 1954 and his Masters in 1955.

After completing his degrees at the University of Galway, McQuillan was offered a graduate fellowship at Johns Hopkins. He completed his PhD there under Professor Jun-Ichi Igusa. The title of his dissertation was "A Generalization of a Theorem of Hecke.”

== Career ==
On receiving his PhD, McQuillan accepted a lectureship at Galway University. In 1963, he returned to the US to take up a teaching position at the math department at the University of Wisconsin-Madison. McQuillan lectured there between 1963 and 1975 and was promoted to full professor in 1969.

In 1975, McQuillan returned to Ireland after being appointed Chair of Mathematics at University College Dublin. He remained head of the department for six years and was Dean of the Faculty of Arts for three.

Over the course of his career, Don McQuillan had one-year visiting positions at the University of Cambridge, England (funded by the American National Science Foundation), the University of Bordeaux, and the University of Iowa. He also spent a summer in the US National Bureau of Standards in Washington, DC. In the eighties, McQuillan taught and did research at the University of Caen, where he collaborated with Professor Yves Hellegouarch. McQuillan has published widely in international journals in the areas of algebra and number theory, including: American Journal of Mathematics, Journal für die reine und angewandte Mathematik, Acta Arithmetica, Archiv der Mathematik, Proceedings of the Royal Irish Academy, Séminaire Delange-Pisot-Poiteau, and the Canadian Journal of Mathematics.

In 1995, McQuillan retired from mathematics and was appointed Director of Quality Assurance at UCD and subsequently for all Irish universities. His work promoted the facilitation of the movement of citizens in the EU as required by the Union. He also worked with the European Universities Association, reviewing universities across Europe. During this period, the Holy See invited Don McQuillan to design and implement QA measures for European Catholic colleges and universities. He continued working with the Vatican until he retired in 2018.

== Other achievements ==
In 1955, McQuillan was captain and No. 10 of the Galway University soccer team, which went on to win the Collingwood Cup - a first in the university’s sporting history.

== Family ==
Don McQuillan was married to Brigid McManus. They had three daughters and one son, eight grandchildren, and two great grandchildren.

== Selected publications ==
- A generalization of a theorem of Hecke, Amer. Jour. Math., Vol 84 (1962), pp.306-316. Some results on the linear fractional group, Illinois J. Math., Vol 10 (1966), pp. 24-38.
- On the genus of fields of elliptic modular functions, Illinois J. Math., Vol 10, (1966), pp. 479-487.
- A note on Weierstrass points, Canadian Jour. of Math., Vol 19 (1967), pp. 268-272
- On a class of ideals in an algebraic number field, Jour. of Number Theory, Vol. 2 (May, 1970), pp. 207- 222. With Hiroshi Gunji.
- A remark on Hilbert’s Theorem 92 Acta Arithmetica, Vol 22 (1973), pp. 125-128.
- Réseaux sur les anneaux d’entiers algébriques, Séminaire Delange-Pisot-Poiteau (Théorie des nombres), 14e année, mai 1972/1973, no. 25, Université de Paris.
- An analogue of class-number in higher dimensions. Journal für die reine und angewandte Mathematik, 288 (1976), pp. 183-191. With Hiroshi Gunji.
- On the subfields in extension rings. Archiv der Math.,Vol. 35 (1980), Fasc. 5, pp 424-433
- On Prüfer domains of polynomials. Jour. reine und agnew. Math.,(1985), Vol 358, pp. 162-178.
- On ideals in Prüfer domains of polynomials. Archiv der Math.,Vol 45 (1985), pp. 517-527.
- On rings of integer-valued polynomials determined by finite sets. Proc. Roy. Ir. Acad. Vol 85A, (1985), No. 2, pp. 177-184.
- Unités de certains sous-anneaux de corps de fonctions algébriques; with R Paysant-Le Roux, and Yves Hellegouarch. Acta Arithmetica, Vol XLVIII (1987), pp. 9-47.
