= Harish-Chandra class =

In mathematics, Harish-Chandra's class is a class of Lie groups used in representation theory. Harish-Chandra's class contains all semisimple connected linear Lie groups and is closed under natural operations, most importantly, the passage to Levi subgroups. This closure property is crucial for many inductive arguments in representation theory of Lie groups, whereas the classes of semisimple or connected semisimple Lie groups are not closed in this sense.

== Definition ==
A Lie group G with the Lie algebra g is said to be in Harish-Chandra's class if it satisfies the following conditions:

- g is a reductive Lie algebra (the product of a semisimple and abelian Lie algebra).
- The Lie group G has only a finite number of connected components.
- The adjoint action of any element of G on g is given by an action of an element of the connected component of the Lie group of Lie algebra automorphisms of the complexification g⊗C.
- The subgroup G_{ss} of G generated by the image of the semisimple part g_{ss}=[g,g] of the Lie algebra g under the exponential map has finite center.
