= Madis Müller =

Estonian banker

Chairman of the Bank of Estonia
- Incumbent
- Assumed office 2019

Personal details
- Born: 20 January 1977 (age 49) Tallinn
- Education: George Washington University

Madis Müller (born 20 January 1977 in Tallinn) is an Estonian banker. Since 2019, he is the chairman of the Bank of Estonia.

== Career ==
A former government and World Bank advisor, Müller served as the deputy chairman of the Bank of Estonia from 2011 to 2019. In this capacity, he was responsible for the implementation of monetary policy decisions and for managing the central bank’s financial assets.

== Other activities ==
- European Central Bank (ECB), Ex-Officio Member of the Governing Council (since 2019)
- International Monetary Fund (IMF), Ex-Officio Member of the Board of Governors (since 2019)
