= Freydoon Shahidi =

Iranian mathematician

Freydoon Shahidi (Persian: فریدون شهیدی; born June 19, 1947) is an Iranian American mathematician who is a Distinguished Professor of Mathematics at Purdue University in the U.S. He is known for a method of automorphic L-functions which is now known as the Langlands–Shahidi method.

== Education and career ==
Shahidi graduated from the University of Tehran with a bachelor's degree in 1969. He received his Ph.D. in 1975 from Johns Hopkins University with dissertation On Gauss Sums Attached to the Pairs and the Exterior Powers of the Representations of the General Linear Groups over Finite and Local Fields with advisor Joseph Shalika. As a postdoc Shahidi was for the academic year 1975–1976 at the Institute for Advanced Study and for the academic year 1976–1977 a visiting assistant professor at Indiana University in Bloomington. At Purdue University he became in 1977 an assistant professor, in 1982 an associate professor, and 1986 a full professor. There he since 2001 is a Distinguished Professor.

He returned to the Institute for Advanced Study in 1983–1984, in 1990–1991, in October–November 1999, and in several other brief visits. He has held visiting positions from 1981 to 1982 at the University of Toronto, in June 1990 at the University of Paris VII, in May 1993 and again in February 1997 as a Fellow of the Japan Society for the Promotion of Science at Kyōto University, in June–July 1993 at the Catholic University of Eichstätt-Ingolstadt, in May–June 1995 at the École normale supérieure, and at several other institutions.

Shahidi was a Guggenheim Fellow for the academic year 2001–2002. He was in 2002 an Invited Speaker at the International Congress of Mathematicians in Beijing with talk Automorphic L-functions and functoriality. He is a member of the American Academy of Arts and Sciences since 2010. In 2012 he became a fellow of the American Mathematical Society. He is a member of the editorial board of the American Journal of Mathematics.

== Selected publications ==
- Eisenstein Series and Automorphic L-Functions, AMS Colloquium Publications 58, 2010
- Functional Equation Satisfied by Certain L-Functions, Compositio Math., vol. 37, 1978, 171–208.
- On certain L-functions, American Journal of Mathematics, vol. 103, 1981, 297–355. doi:10.2307/2374219
- A proof of Langlands conjecture on Plancherel measures; Complementary series for p-adic groups, Annals of Mathematics, Band 132, 1990, 273–330 doi:10.2307/1971524
- Local coefficients as Artin L-factors for real groups, Duke Math. J., vol. 52, 1985, 973–1007
- with Stephen Gelbart: Boundedness of automorphic L-functions in vertical strips, Journal of the American Mathematical Society, vol. 14, 2001, 79–107. doi:10.1090/S0894-0347-00-00351-9
- mit H. H. Kim: Functorial products for GL(2) × GL(3) and the symmetric cube for GL(2), Annals of Mathematics, vol. 155, 2002, 837–893. doi:10.1016/S0764-4442(00)01677-3
- On nonvanishing of L-functions, Bull. Amer. Math. Soc. (N.S.), vol. 2, 1980, 462–464.
- On the Ramanujan conjecture and finiteness of poles of certain L-functions, Annals of Mathematics, vol. 127, 1988, 547–584 doi:10.2307/2007005
- The notion of norm and the representation theory of orthogonal groups, Inventiones mathematicae, vol. 119, 1995, 1–36 doi:10.1007/BF01245173
