= James Arthur (mathematician) =

Canadian mathematician (born 1944)

James Arthur CC
- Born: May 18, 1944 (age 82); Hamilton, Ontario, Canada
- Education: University of Toronto (BSc, MSc); Yale University (PhD)
- Known for: Arthur–Selberg trace formula Arthur conjectures
- Awards: John L. Synge Award (1987); Jeffery–Williams Prize (1993); CRM-Fields-PIMS prize (1997); Henry Marshall Tory Medal (1997); Gerhard Herzberg Canada Gold Medal for Science and Engineering (1999); Wolf Prize (2015); Leroy P. Steele Prize for Lifetime Achievement (2017)
- Scientific career
- Fields: Mathematics
- Workplaces: Yale University; Duke University; University of Toronto
- Thesis: Analysis of Tempered Distributions on Semisimple Lie Groups of Real Rank One (1970)
- Doctoral advisor: Robert Langlands
- Doctoral students: Cristina Ballantine

James Greig Arthur CC FRSC FRS (born May 18, 1944) is a Canadian mathematician working on automorphic forms, and former President of the American Mathematical Society. He is a Mossman Chair and University Professor Emeritus at the University of Toronto Department of Mathematics. He won the Wolf Prize in 2015 "for his monumental work on the trace formula and his fundamental contributions to the theory of automorphic representations of reductive groups".

== Education and career ==
Born in Hamilton, Ontario, Arthur graduated from Upper Canada College in 1962, received a BSc from the University of Toronto in 1966, and a MSc from the same institution in 1967. He received his PhD from Yale University in 1970. He was a student of Robert Langlands; his dissertation was Analysis of Tempered Distributions on Semisimple Lie Groups of Real Rank One.

Arthur taught at Yale from 1970 until 1976. He joined the faculty of Duke University in 1976. He has been a professor at the University of Toronto since 1978. He was four times a visiting scholar at the Institute for Advanced Study between 1976 and 2002.

== Contributions ==
Arthur is known for the Arthur–Selberg trace formula, generalizing the Selberg trace formula from the rank-one case (due to Selberg himself) to general reductive groups, one of the most important tools for research on the Langlands program. He also introduced the Arthur conjectures. His seminal 2013 book The endoscopic classification of representations—orthogonal and symplectic groups uses the trace formula to establish important special cases of the Langlands Functoriality Principle.

== Recognition ==
Arthur was elected a Fellow of the Royal Society of Canada in 1981 and a Fellow of the Royal Society in 1992. In 1998 he was an Invited Speaker of the International Congress of Mathematicians in Berlin. He was elected a Foreign Honorary Member of the American Academy of Arts and Sciences in 2003. In 2012 he became a fellow of the American Mathematical Society. He was elected as a fellow of the Canadian Mathematical Society in 2019.
