= Local trace formula =

On the character of the representation of a reductive algebraic group

In mathematics, the local trace formula is a local analogue of the Arthur–Selberg trace formula that describes the character of the representation of G(F) on the discrete part of L^{2}(G(F)), for G a reductive algebraic group over a local field F.
