= Kuznetsov trace formula =

Formula in analytic number theory

In analytic number theory, the Kuznetsov trace formula is an extension of the Petersson trace formula.

The Kuznetsov or relative trace formula connects Kloosterman sums at a deep level with the spectral theory of automorphic forms. Originally this could have been stated as follows. Let

$$g: \mathbb{R}\rightarrow \mathbb{R}$$

be a sufficiently "well behaved" function. Then one calls identities of the following type Kuznetsov trace formula:

$$\sum_{c\equiv 0\, \text{mod}\ N} c^{-r} K(m,n,c) g\left(\frac{4\pi \sqrt{mn}}{c}\right) = \text{Integral transform}\ +\ \text{Spectral terms}.$$

The integral transform part is some integral transform of g and the spectral part is a sum of Fourier coefficients, taken over spaces of holomorphic and non-holomorphic modular forms twisted with some integral transform of g. The Kuznetsov trace formula was found by Kuznetsov while studying the growth of weight zero automorphic functions. Using estimates on Kloosterman sums he was able to derive estimates for Fourier coefficients of modular forms in cases where Pierre Deligne's proof of the Weil conjectures was not applicable.

It was later translated by Jacquet to a representation theoretic framework. Let $G$ be a reductive group over a number field F and $H\subset G$ be a subgroup. While the usual trace formula studies the harmonic analysis on G, the relative trace formula is a tool for studying the harmonic analysis on the symmetric space $G/H$. For an overview and numerous applications Cogdell, J.W. and I. Piatetski-Shapiro, The arithmetic and spectral analysis of Poincaré series, volume 13 of Perspectives in mathematics. Academic Press Inc., Boston, MA, (1990).
