= Joseph Shalika =

American mathematician (1941–2010)

- Born: June 25, 1941
- Died: September 18, 2010 (aged 69)
- Education: Johns Hopkins University
- Scientific career
- Fields: Mathematics
- Workplaces: Johns Hopkins University
- Doctoral advisor: Friederich Ignaz Mautner
- Doctoral students: Freydoon Shahidi; Ramin Takloo-Bighash

Joseph Andrew Shalika (June 25, 1941 – September 18, 2010) was a mathematician working on automorphic forms and representation theory, who introduced the multiplicity-one theorem. He was a member of the Institute for Advanced Study from 1965 to 1966.
