= Langlands decomposition =

In mathematics, the Langlands decomposition writes a parabolic subgroup P of a semisimple Lie group as a product $P=MAN$ of a reductive subgroup M, an abelian subgroup A, and a nilpotent subgroup N.

== Applications ==
A key application is in parabolic induction, which leads to the Langlands program: if $G$ is a reductive algebraic group and $P=MAN$ is the Langlands decomposition of a parabolic subgroup P, then parabolic induction consists of taking a representation of $MA$, extending it to $P$ by letting $N$ act trivially, and inducing the result from $P$ to $G$.

== See also ==
- Lie group decompositions
