= Petersson trace formula =

In analytic number theory, the Petersson trace formula is a kind of orthogonality relation between coefficients of a holomorphic modular form. It is a specialization of the more general Kuznetsov trace formula.

In its simplest form the Petersson trace formula is as follows. Let $\mathcal{F}$ be an orthonormal basis of $S_k(\Gamma(1))$, the space of cusp forms of weight $k>2$ on $SL_2(\mathbb{Z})$. Then for any positive integers $m,n$ we have

$$\frac{\Gamma(k-1)}{(4\pi \sqrt{mn})^{k-1}} \sum_{f \in \mathcal{F}} \bar{\hat{f}}(m) \hat{f}(n) = \delta_{mn} + 2\pi i^{-k} \sum_{c > 0}\frac{S(m,n;c)}{c} J_{k-1}\left(\frac{4\pi \sqrt{mn}}{c}\right),$$

where $\delta$ is the Kronecker delta function, $S$ is the Kloosterman sum and $J$ is the Bessel function of the first kind.
