= Weil group =

Concept in class field theory

In mathematics, a Weil group, introduced by André Weil, is a modification of the absolute Galois group of a local or global field, used in class field theory. For such a field $F$, its Weil group is generally denoted $W_F$. There also exists "finite level" modifications of the Galois groups: if $E/F$ is a finite extension, then the relative Weil group of $E/F$ is $W_{E/F}=W_F/W_E^c$ (where the superscript $c$ denotes the commutator subgroup).

== Class formation ==
The Weil group of a class formation with fundamental classes $u_{E/F}=H^2(E/F,A^F)$ is a kind of modified Galois group, used in various formulations of class field theory, and in particular in the Langlands program.

If $E/F$ is a normal layer, then the (relative) Weil group $W_{E/F}$ of $E/F$ is the extension

$$1\to A^F\to W_{E/F}\to\operatorname{Gal}(E/F)\to 1$$

corresponding (using the interpretation of elements in the second group cohomology as central extensions) to the fundamental class $u_{E/F}$ in $H^2(\operatorname{Gal}(E/F),A^F)$. The Weil group of the whole formation is defined to be the inverse limit of the Weil groups of all the layers $G/F$, for $F$ an open subgroup of $G$.

The reciprocity map of the class formation $(G,A)$ induces an isomorphism from $A^G$ to the abelianization of the Weil group.

== Archimedean local field ==
For archimedean local fields the Weil group is easy to describe: for $\C$ it is the group $\C^\times$ of non-zero complex numbers, and for $\R$ it is a non-split extension of the Galois group of order 2 by the group of non-zero complex numbers, and can be identified with the subgroup $\C^\times\cup j\C^\times$ of the non-zero quaternions.

== Finite field ==
For finite fields the Weil group is infinite cyclic. A distinguished generator is provided by the Frobenius automorphism. Certain conventions on terminology, such as arithmetic Frobenius, trace back to the fixing here of a generator (as the Frobenius or its inverse).

== Local field ==
For a local field of characteristic $p>0$, the Weil group is the subgroup of the absolute Galois group of elements that act as a power of the Frobenius automorphism on the constant field (the union of all finite subfields).

For $p$-adic fields the Weil group is a dense subgroup of the absolute Galois group, and consists of all elements whose image in the Galois group of the residue field is an integral power of the Frobenius automorphism.

More specifically, in these cases, the Weil group does not have the subspace topology, but rather a finer topology. This topology is defined by giving the inertia subgroup its subspace topology and imposing that it be an open subgroup of the Weil group. (The resulting topology is "locally profinite".)

== Function field ==
For global fields of characteristic $p>0$ (function fields), the Weil group is the subgroup of the absolute Galois group of elements that act as a power of the Frobenius automorphism on the constant field (the union of all finite subfields).

== Number field ==
For number fields there is no known "natural" construction of the Weil group without using cocycles to construct the extension. The map from the Weil group to the Galois group is surjective, and its kernel is the connected component of the identity of the Weil group, which is quite complicated.

== Weil–Deligne group ==
The Weil–Deligne group scheme (or simply Weil–Deligne group) $W_K'$ of a non-archimedean local field $K$ is an extension of the Weil group $W_K$ by a one-dimensional additive group scheme $G_a$, introduced by Pierre Deligne. In this extension the Weil group acts on the additive group by

$$wxw^{-1} = \|w\|x$$

where $w$ acts on the residue field of order $q$ as $a\to a^{\|w\|}$ with $\|w\|$ a power of $q$.

The local Langlands correspondence for $\operatorname{GL}_n$ over $K$ states that there is a natural bijection between isomorphism classes of irreducible admissible representations of $\operatorname{GL}_n(K)$ and certain $n$-dimensional representations of the Weil–Deligne group of $K$.

The Weil–Deligne group often shows up through its representations. In such cases, the Weil–Deligne group is sometimes taken to be $W_K\times\operatorname{SL}(2,\C)$ or $W_K\times\operatorname{SU}(2,\R)$, or is simply done away with and Weil–Deligne representations of $W_K$ are used instead.

In the archimedean case, the Weil–Deligne group is simply defined to be Weil group.

== See also ==
- Langlands group
- Shafarevich–Weil theorem
