= Langlands group =

Mathematical object

In mathematics, the Langlands group is a conjectural group $L_F$ attached to each local or global field $F$ that satisfies properties similar to those of the Weil group. It was named after Robert Langlands by Robert Kottwitz. In Kottwitz's formulation, the Langlands group should be an extension of the Weil group by a compact group. When $F$ is local archimedean, $L_F$ is the Weil group of $F$, when $F$ is local non-archimedean, $L_F$ is the product of the Weil group of $F$ with SU(2). When $F$ is global, the existence of $L_F$ is still conjectural, though James Arthur gives a conjectural description of it. The Langlands correspondence for $F$ is a "natural" correspondence between the irreducible $n$-dimensional complex representations of $L_F$ and, in the global case, the cuspidal automorphic representations of $\operatorname{GL}_n(\mathbb{A}_F)$, where $\mathbb{A}_F$ denotes the adeles of $F$.
