= Langlands program =

Conjectures connecting number theory and geometry

In mathematics, the Langlands program is a set of conjectures about connections between number theory, the theory of automorphic forms, and geometry. It was proposed by the Canadian mathematician Robert Langlands (1967, 1970). More precisely, it seeks to relate the structure of Galois groups in algebraic number theory to automorphic forms and, more generally, the representation theory of algebraic groups over local fields and adeles.

== Background ==
The Langlands program is built on existing ideas: the philosophy of cusp forms formulated a few years earlier by Harish-Chandra and Gelfand, the work and Harish-Chandra's approach on semisimple Lie groups, and in technical terms the trace formula of Selberg and others.

What was new in Langlands' work, besides technical depth, was the proposed connection to number theory, together with its rich organisational structure hypothesised (so-called functoriality).

Harish-Chandra's work exploited the principle that what can be done for one semisimple (or reductive) Lie group can be done for all. Therefore, once the role of some low-dimensional Lie groups such as GL(2) in the theory of modular forms had been recognised, and with hindsight GL(1) in class field theory, the way was open to speculation about GL(n) for general n > 2.

The "cusp form" idea came out of the cusps on modular curves but also had a meaning visible in spectral theory as "discrete spectrum", contrasted with the "continuous spectrum" from Eisenstein series. It becomes much more technical for bigger Lie groups, because the parabolic subgroups are more numerous.

In all these approaches technical methods were available, often inductive in nature and based on Levi decompositions amongst other matters, but the field remained demanding.

From the perspective of modular forms, examples such as Hilbert modular forms, Siegel modular forms, and theta-series had been developed.

== Objects ==
The conjectures have evolved since Langlands first stated them. Langlands conjectures apply across many different groups over many different fields for which they can be stated, and each field offers several versions of the conjectures. Some versions are vague, or depend on objects such as Langlands groups, whose existence is unproven, or on the L-group that has several non-equivalent definitions.

Objects for which Langlands conjectures can be stated:

- Representations of reductive groups over local fields (with different subcases corresponding to archimedean local fields, p-adic local fields, and completions of function fields)
- Automorphic forms on reductive groups over global fields (with subcases corresponding to number fields or function fields).
- Analogues for finite fields.
- More general fields, such as function fields over the complex numbers.

== Conjectures ==
The conjectures can be stated variously in ways that are closely related but not obviously equivalent.

=== Reciprocity ===
The starting point of the program was Emil Artin's reciprocity law, which generalizes quadratic reciprocity. The Artin reciprocity law applies to a Galois extension of an algebraic number field whose Galois group is abelian; it assigns L-functions to the one-dimensional representations of this Galois group, and states that these L-functions are identical to certain Dirichlet L-series or more general series (that is, certain analogues of the Riemann zeta function) constructed from Hecke characters. The precise correspondence between these different kinds of L-functions constitutes Artin's reciprocity law.

For non-abelian Galois groups and higher-dimensional representations of them, L-functions can be defined in a natural way: Artin L-functions.

Langlands' insight was to find the proper generalization of Dirichlet L-functions, which would allow the formulation of Artin's statement in Langland's more general setting. Hecke had earlier related Dirichlet L-functions with automorphic forms (holomorphic functions on the upper half plane of the complex number plane $\mathbb{C}$ that satisfy certain functional equations). Langlands then generalized these to automorphic cuspidal representations, which are certain infinite dimensional irreducible representations of the general linear group GL(n) over the adele ring of $\mathbb{Q}$ (the rational numbers). (This ring tracks all the completions of $\mathbb{Q},$ see p-adic numbers.)

Langlands attached automorphic L-functions to these automorphic representations, and conjectured that every Artin L-function arising from a finite-dimensional representation of the Galois group of a number field is equal to one arising from an automorphic cuspidal representation. This is known as his reciprocity conjecture.

Roughly speaking, this conjecture gives a correspondence between automorphic representations of a reductive group and homomorphisms from a Langlands group to an L-group. This offers numerous variations, in part because the definitions of Langlands group and L-group are not fixed.

Over local fields this is expected to give a parameterization of L-packets of admissible irreducible representations of a reductive group over the local field. For example, over the real numbers, this correspondence is the Langlands classification of representations of real reductive groups. Over global fields, it should give a parameterization of automorphic forms.

=== Functoriality ===
The functoriality conjecture states that a suitable homomorphism of L-groups is expected to give a correspondence between automorphic forms (in the global case) or representations (in the local case). Roughly speaking, the Langlands reciprocity conjecture is the special case of the functoriality conjecture when one of the reductive groups is trivial.

==== Generalized functoriality ====
Langlands generalized the idea of functoriality: instead of using the general linear group GL(n), other connected reductive groups can be used. Furthermore, given such a group G, Langlands constructs the Langlands dual group ^{L}G, and then, for every automorphic cuspidal representation of G and every finite-dimensional representation of ^{L}G, he defines an L-function. One of his conjectures states that these L-functions satisfy a certain functional equation generalizing those of other known L-functions.

He then goes on to formulate a very general "Functoriality Principle". Given two reductive groups and a (well behaved) morphism between their corresponding L-groups, this conjecture relates their automorphic representations in a way that is compatible with their L-functions. This functoriality conjecture implies all the other conjectures presented so far. It is of the nature of an induced representation construction—what in the more traditional theory of automorphic forms had been called a 'lifting', known in special cases, and so is covariant (whereas a restricted representation is contravariant). Attempts to specify a direct construction have only produced some conditional results.

All these conjectures can be formulated for more general fields in place of $\mathbb{Q}$: algebraic number fields (the original and most important case), local fields, and function fields.

=== Geometric conjectures ===
The geometric Langlands program, suggested by Gérard Laumon following ideas of Vladimir Drinfeld, arises from a geometric reformulation of the usual Langlands program that attempts to relate more than just irreducible representations. In simple cases, it relates l-adic representations of the étale fundamental group of an algebraic curve to objects of the derived category of l-adic sheaves on the moduli stack of vector bundles over the curve.

In 2024, a 9-person collaborative project led by Dennis Gaitsgory announced a proof of the (categorical, unramified) geometric Langlands conjecture leveraging Hecke eigensheaves as part of the proof, looking at the automorphic and spectral sides.

== Status ==
The Langlands correspondence for GL(1, K) follows from (and is essentially equivalent to) class field theory.

Langlands proved the Langlands conjectures for groups over the archimedean local fields $\mathbb{R}$ (the real numbers) and $\mathbb{C}$ (the complex numbers) by giving the Langlands classification of their irreducible representations.

Lusztig's classification of the irreducible representations of groups of Lie type over finite fields can be considered an analogue of the Langlands conjectures for finite fields.

Andrew Wiles' proof of modularity of semistable elliptic curves over rationals can be viewed as an instance of the Langlands reciprocity conjecture, since the main idea is to relate the Galois representations arising from elliptic curves to modular forms. Although Wiles' results have been substantially generalized, in many different directions, the full Langlands conjecture for $\text{GL}(2,\mathbb{Q})$ remains unproved.

In 1998, Laurent Lafforgue proved Lafforgue's theorem verifying the global Langlands correspondence for the general linear group GL(n, K) for function fields K. This work continued earlier investigations by Drinfeld, who previously addressed the case of GL(2, K) in the 1980s.

In 2018, Vincent Lafforgue established one half of the global Langlands correspondence (the direction from automorphic forms to Galois representations) for connected reductive groups over global function fields.

=== Local Langlands conjectures ===
Philip Kutzko proved the local Langlands correspondence for the general linear group GL(2, K) over local fields.

Gérard Laumon, Michael Rapoport, and Ulrich Stuhler proved the local Langlands correspondence for the general linear group GL(n, K) for positive characteristic local fields K. Their proof uses a global argument, realizing smooth admissible representations of interest as the local components of automorphic representations of the group of units of a division algebra over a curve, then using the point-counting formula to study the properties of the global Galois representations associated to these representations.

Michael Harris and Richard Taylor proved the local Langlands conjectures for the general linear group GL(n, K) for characteristic 0 local fields K. Guy Henniart gave another proof. Both proofs use a global argument of a similar flavor to the one mentioned in the previous paragraph. Peter Scholze gave another proof.

==== Fargues–Scholze program ====
Laurent Fargues and Peter Scholze recast the local Langlands correspondence in geometric terms using the Fargues–Fontaine curve. In their approach, the key automorphic object is the stack $\operatorname{Bun}_G$ of $G$-bundles on the Fargues–Fontaine curve, viewed as a geometric replacement for the representation theory of $G(E)$ over a non-archimedean local field $E$.

Fargues and Scholze develop a theory of $\ell$-adic sheaves on $\operatorname{Bun}_G$, prove a version of the geometric Satake equivalence for the Fargues–Fontaine curve, and define a geometric moduli stack of Langlands parameters.

Their work also formulates a conjectural categorical form of local Langlands, in which the usual correspondence between representations and parameters is expected to arise from a deeper relationship between categories of sheaves on $\operatorname{Bun}_G$ and coherent sheaves on the stack of Langlands parameters. This is thus not a complete proof of the local Langlands correspondence for all reductive groups, but a geometric reformulation that yields new results and a broadened conceptual framework for the subject.

=== Fundamental lemma ===
In 2008, Ngô Bảo Châu proved the "fundamental lemma", which was conjectured initially by Langlands and Shelstad in 1983 and is required in the proof of some essential conjectures in the Langlands program.

== See also ==
- Erlangen program
- Geometric Langlands correspondence
- Jacquet–Langlands correspondence
- Robert Langlands
