= Stephen Rallis =

American mathematician (1942–2012)

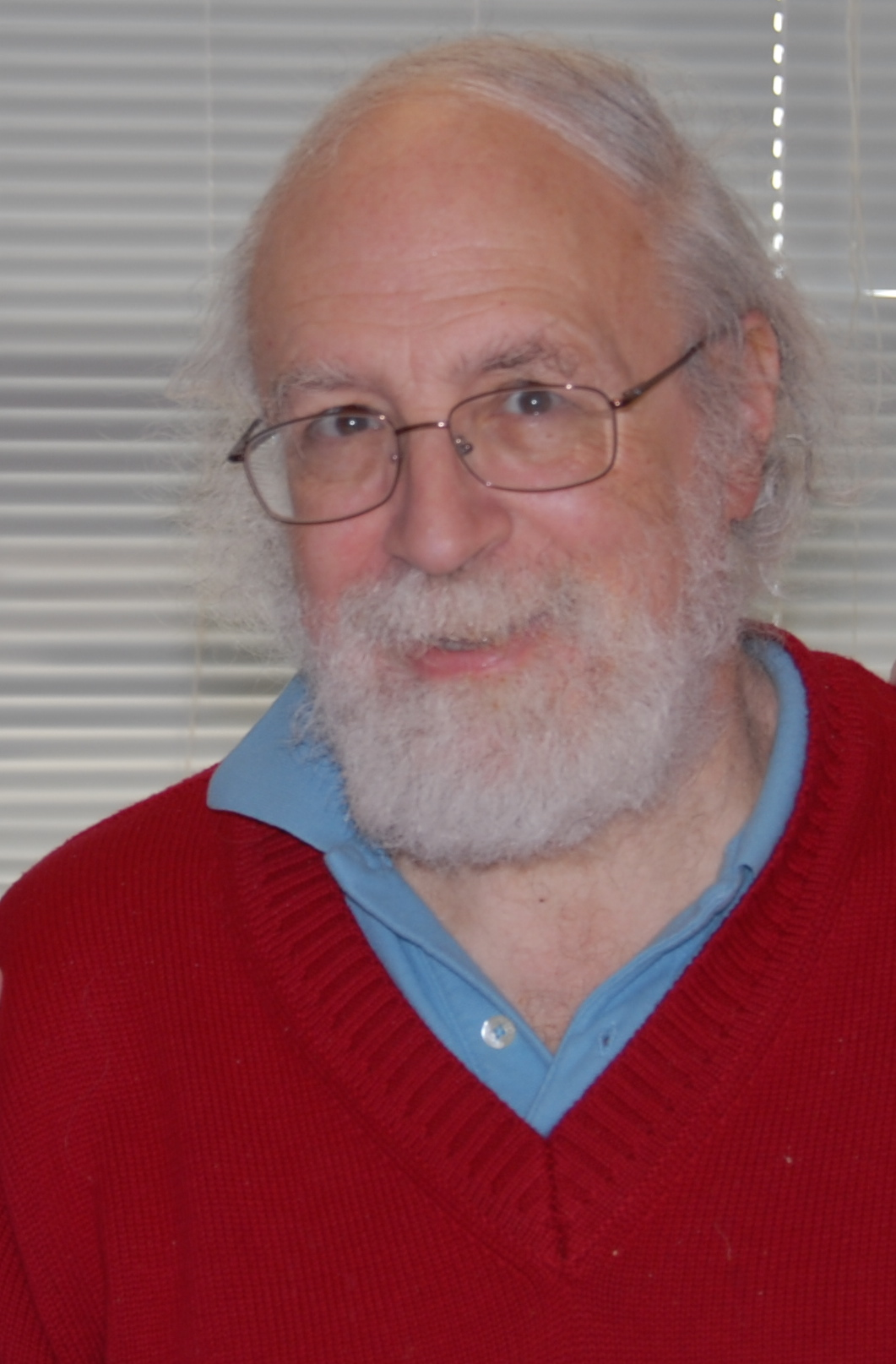
- Stephen Rallis
- Born: Stephen Rallis; 17 May 1942; Bennington, Vermont
- Died: 17 April 2012 (aged 69); Columbus, Ohio
- Education: Massachusetts Institute of Technology (PhD, 1968); Harvard University (BA, 1964)
- Known for: Rallis Inner Product Formula automorphic descent
- Relatives: Nancy Rallis (sister)
- Scientific career
- Fields: Mathematics
- Workplaces: Ohio State University
- Thesis: Orbits and Representations Associated with Symmetric Spaces (1968)
- Doctoral advisor: Bertram Kostant
- Doctoral students: Dihua Jiang

Stephen James Rallis (May 17, 1942 – April 17, 2012) was an American mathematician who worked on group representations, automorphic forms, the Siegel–Weil formula, and Langlands L-functions.

== Career ==
Rallis received a B.A. in 1964 from Harvard University, a Ph.D. in 1968 from the Massachusetts Institute of Technology, and spent 1968–1970 at the Institute for Advanced Study in Princeton. After two years at Stony Brook, two years at Universite de Strasbourg, and several visiting positions, he joined the faculty at Ohio State University in 1977 and stayed there for the rest of his career.

== Work ==
Beginning in the 1970s, Rallis and Gérard Schiffmann wrote a series of papers on the Weil representation. This led to Rallis's work with Kudla in which they developed a far-reaching generalization of the Siegel–Weil formula: the regularized Siegel–Weil formula and the first term identity. These results have prompted other mathematicians to extend Siegel–Weil to other cases. Rallis' 1984 paper giving proofs of certain examples of the Howe duality conjecture was the start of his work on what is now known as "The Rallis Inner Product Formula" which relates the inner product of a pair of theta functions to a special value or residue of a Langlands L-function. This cornerstone of what Wee Teck Gan et al. term the Rallis program on the theta correspondence has found wide applications. Rallis then adapted the classical idea of doubling a quadratic space to create the "Piatetski–Shapiro and Rallis Doubling Method" for constructing integral representations of L-functions, and thus they obtained the first general result on L-functions for all classical groups. The 1990 Wolf Prize to Piatetski–Shapiro cites this work with Rallis as one of Piatetski–Shapiro's main achievements. Whereas it had previously been assumed that all the L-functions constructed by the Rankin–Selberg integral method were a subset of those constructed by the Langlands–Shahidi method, the 1992 paper by Rallis with Piatetski-Shapiro and Schiffmann on the Rankin–Selberg integrals for the group G_2 showed this was not the case and opened the way for determining many new examples of L-functions represented by Rankin–Selberg integrals.

The L-functions studied by Rallis are important because of their connections with the Langlands functoriality conjecture. Rallis with David Soudry and David Ginzburg wrote a series of papers culminating in their book "The descent map from automorphic representations of GL(n) to classical groups". Their automorphic descent method constructs an explicit inverse map to the (standard) Langlands functorial lift and has had major applications to the analysis of functoriality. Also, using the "Rallis tower property" from his 1984 paper on the Howe duality conjecture, Rallis with Ginzburg and Soudry studied global exceptional correspondences and found new examples of functorial lifts.

In 1990, Rallis gave an invited address on his work "Poles of Standard L-functions" at the 1990 International Congress of Mathematicians in Kyoto. In 2003, the conference "Automorphic Representations, L-Functions and Applications: Progress and Prospects" was held in honor of Rallis's 60th birthday and according to the conference proceedings, "reflects the depth and breadth of Rallis's influence". In January, 2015, the Journal of Number Theory published a special issue in honor of Steve Rallis's contributions to mathematics. Rallis has the distinction of having his biography included in the MacTutor History of Mathematics archive.

In a series of papers between 2004 and 2009, David Ginzburg, Dihua Jiang, and Stephen Rallis proved one direction of the global Gan–Gross–Prasad conjecture.

Rallis's ideas had a significant and lasting impact on the theory of automorphic forms. His mathematical life was characterized by several long term collaborations with several mathematicians including Stephen Kudla, Herve Jacquet, and Ilya Piatetski-Shapiro.

== Selected publications ==
=== Articles ===
- Langlands’ functoriality and the Weil representation. Amer.J.Math. 104 (1982), no. 3, 469–515. MR 0658543
- On the Howe duality conjecture. Compositio Math. 51 (1984), no.3, 333–399. MR 0743016
- with Stephen Kudla: On the Weil–Siegel formula. J. Reine Angew. Math. 387 (1988), no. 1, 1–68. MR 0946349
- with Ilya Piatetski-Shapiro: A new way to get Euler products. J.Reine Angew. Math. 392 (1988), 110–124. MR 0965059
- with Ilya Piatetski-Shapiro and Gerard Schiffmann: Rankin–Selberg integrals for the group G_2. Amer. J. Math. 114 (1992), no.6, 1269–1315. MR 1198304
- with Stephen Kudla: A regularized Siegel–Weil formula: the first term identity. Ann. Of Math. (2) 140 (1994), no. 1, 1–80. MR 1289491
- with Herve Jacquet: Uniqueness of linear periods. Compositio Math. 387 (1996), no. 1, 65–123. MR 1394521
- with David Ginzburg and David Soudry: A tower of theta correspondences for G_2. Duke Math. J. 88 (1997), no. 3, 537–624. MR 1455531
- with David Ginzburg and David Soudry: On explicit lifts of cusp forms from GL(m) to classical groups. Annals of Mathematics (2) 150 (1999), no. 3, 807–866. MR 1740991
- with Erez Lapid: On the nonnegativity of L(1/2,pi) for SO_2(n + 1). Ann. of Math.(2) 157 (2003), no. 3, 891–917. MR 1983784
- with Avraham Aizenbud, Dmitry Gourevitch and Gerard Schiffmann: Multiplicity one theorems. Annals of Mathematics (2) 172 (2010), no. 2, 1407–1434. MR 2680495

=== Books ===
- L-functions and the oscillator representation. Springer. 1987. ISBN 0691081565.
- with Stephen Gelbart and Ilya Piatetski-Shapiro:Explicit constructions of automorphic L-functions. Springer. 1987.
- with David Ginzburg and David Soudry: The descent map from automorphic representations of GL(n) to classical groups. World Scientific Publication Co. 2011.

== Sources and further reading ==
- Cogdell, James; Jiang, Dihua, eds. (March 2013). "Remembering Steve Rallis" (PDF). Notices of the AMS. 60 (4): 466–469.
- O'Connor, John J.; Robertson, Edmund F., "Stephen Rallis", MacTutor History of Mathematics Archive, University of St Andrews
