= Gan–Gross–Prasad conjecture =

Conjecture in the representation theory of Lie groups

- Field: Representation theory
- Conjectured by: Gan Wee Teck; Benedict Gross; Dipendra Prasad
- Conjectured in: 2012

In mathematics, the Gan–Gross–Prasad conjecture is a restriction problem in the representation theory of real or p-adic Lie groups posed by Gan Wee Teck, Benedict Gross, and Dipendra Prasad. The problem originated from a conjecture of Gross and Prasad for special orthogonal groups but was later generalized to include all four classical groups. In the cases considered, it is known that the multiplicity of the restrictions is at most one and the conjecture describes when the multiplicity is precisely one.

== Motivation ==
A motivating example is the following classical branching problem in the theory of compact Lie groups. Let $\pi$ be an irreducible finite-dimensional representation of the compact unitary group $U(n)$, and consider its restriction to the naturally embedded subgroup $U(n-1)$. It is known that this restriction is multiplicity-free, but one may ask precisely which irreducible representations of $U(n-1)$ occur in the restriction.

By the Cartan–Weyl theory of highest weights, there is a classification of the irreducible representations of $U(n)$ via their highest weights which are in natural bijection with sequences of integers $\underline{a} = (a_1 \geq a_2 \geq \cdots \geq a_n)$. Now suppose that $\pi$ has highest weight $\underline{a}$. Then an irreducible representation $\tau$ of $U(n-1)$ with highest weight $\underline{b}$ occurs in the restriction of $\pi$ to $U(n-1)$ (viewed as a subgroup of $U(n)$) if and only if $\underline{a}$ and $\underline{b}$ are interlacing, i.e. $a_1 \geq b_1 \geq a_2 \geq b_2 \geq \cdots \geq b_{n-1} \geq a_n$.

The Gan–Gross–Prasad conjecture then considers the analogous restriction problem for other classical groups.

== Statement ==
The conjecture has slightly different forms for the different classical groups. The formulation for unitary groups is as follows.

=== Setup ===
Let $V$ be a finite-dimensional vector space over a field $k$ not of characteristic $2$ equipped with a non-degenerate sesquilinear form that is $\varepsilon$-Hermitian (i.e. $\varepsilon = 1$ if the form is Hermitian and $\varepsilon = -1$ if the form is skew-Hermitian). Let $W$ be a non-degenerate subspace of $V$ such that $V = W \oplus W^\perp$ and $W^\perp$ is of dimension $(\varepsilon + 1)/2$. Then let $G = G(V) \times G(W)$, where $G(V)$ is the unitary group preserving the form on $V$, and let $H = \Delta G(W)$ be the diagonal subgroup of $G$.

Let $\pi = \pi_1 \boxtimes \pi_2$ be an irreducible smooth representation of $G$ and let $\nu$ be either the trivial representation (the "Bessel case") or the Weil representation (the "Fourier–Jacobi case"). Let $\varphi = \varphi_1 \times \varphi_2$ be a generic L-parameter for $G = G(V) \times G(W)$, and let $\Pi_\varphi$ be the associated Vogan L-packet.

=== Local Gan–Gross–Prasad conjecture ===
If $\varphi$ is a local L-parameter for $G$, then

$$\sum_{\text{relevant } \pi \in \Pi_\varphi} \dim \operatorname{Hom}_H (\pi \otimes \overline{\nu}, \mathbb{C}) = 1.$$

Letting $\eta_{\mathrm{GP}}$ be the "distinguished character" defined in terms of the Langlands–Deligne local constant, then furthermore

$$\operatorname{Hom}_H (\pi(\varphi, \eta) \otimes \overline{\nu}, \mathbb{C}) \neq 0 \text{ if and only if } \eta = \eta_{\mathrm{GP}}.$$

=== Global Gan–Gross–Prasad conjecture ===
For a quadratic field extension $E/F$, let $L_E(s, \pi_1 \times \pi_2) := L_E(s, \pi_1 \boxtimes \pi_2, \mathrm{std}_n \boxtimes \mathrm{std}_{n-1})$ where $L_E$ is the global L-function obtained as the product of local L-factors given by the local Langlands conjectures. The conjecture states that the following are equivalent:

1. The period interval $P_H$ is nonzero when restricted to $\pi$.
2. For all places $v$, the local Hom space $\operatorname{Hom}_{H(F_v)}(\pi_v, \nu_v) \neq 0$ and $L_E(1/2, \pi_1 \times \pi_2) \neq 0$.

== Current status ==
=== Local Gan–Gross–Prasad conjecture ===
In a series of four papers between 2010 and 2012, Jean-Loup Waldspurger proved the local Gan–Gross–Prasad conjecture for tempered representations of special orthogonal groups over p-adic fields. In 2012, Colette Moeglin and Waldspurger then proved the local Gan–Gross–Prasad conjecture for generic non-tempered representations of special orthogonal groups over p-adic fields.

In his 2013 thesis, Raphaël Beuzart-Plessis proved the local Gan–Gross–Prasad conjecture for the tempered representations of unitary groups in the p-adic Hermitian case under the same hypotheses needed to establish the local Langlands conjecture.

Hongyu He proved the Gan–Gross–Prasad conjectures for discrete series representations of the real unitary group U(p,q).

=== Global Gan–Gross–Prasad conjecture ===
In a series of papers between 2004 and 2009, David Ginzburg, Dihua Jiang, and Stephen Rallis showed the (1) implies (2) direction of the global Gan–Gross–Prasad conjecture for all quasisplit classical groups.

In the Bessel case of the global Gan–Gross–Prasad conjecture for unitary groups, Wei Zhang used the theory of the relative trace formula by Hervé Jacquet and the work on the fundamental lemma by Zhiwei Yun to prove that the conjecture is true subject to certain local conditions in 2014.

In the Fourier–Jacobi case of the global Gan–Gross–Prasad conjecture for unitary groups, Yifeng Liu and Hang Xue showed that the conjecture holds in the skew-Hermitian case, subject to certain local conditions.

In the Bessel case of the global Gan–Gross–Prasad conjecture for special orthogonal groups and unitary groups, Dihua Jiang and Lei Zhang used the theory of twisted automorphic descents to prove that (1) implies (2) in its full generality, i.e. for any irreducible cuspidal automorphic representation with a generic global Arthur parameter, and that (2) implies (1) subject to a certain global assumption.
