= Waldspurger =

Waldspurger is a surname. Notable people with this name include:

- Carl A. Waldspurger, computer scientist, 1996 winner of ACM Doctoral Dissertation Award
- Irène Waldspurger, French mathematician
- Jean-Loup Waldspurger (born 1953), French mathematician

== See also ==
- Waldspurger formula and Waldspurger's theorem, named after Jean-Loup Waldspurger
