= Dihua Jiang =

Mathematician at the University of Minnesota

Dihua Jiang（江迪华）
- Born: 1958 (age 67–68); Lucheng District, Wenzhou, Zhejiang, China
- Citizenship: United States
- Education: Zhejiang Normal University; East China Normal University; Ohio State University
- Awards: Sloan Research Fellow (2000); Fellow of the American Mathematical Society (2019); Simons Fellow (2024)
- Scientific career
- Fields: Mathematics
- Workplaces: University of Minnesota
- Thesis: L-Function For The Standard Tensor Product Representation Of Gsp(2) X Gsp(2) (1994)
- Doctoral advisor: Stephen Rallis

Dihua Jiang (simplified Chinese: 江迪华; traditional Chinese: 江迪華; pinyin: Jiāng Díhuá, born 1958) is a Chinese-born American mathematician. He is a professor of mathematics at the University of Minnesota working in number theory, automorphic forms, and the Langlands program.

== Early life and education ==
In 1958, Jiang was born in the Lucheng District of Wenzhou, Zhejiang. He studied at Wenzhou No. 3 Middle School before studying at Zhejiang Normal University, where he received his bachelor's degree in mathematics in 1982. He received a master's degree from East China Normal University in 1987 and a PhD in mathematics from Ohio State University in 1994 under the supervision of Stephen Rallis.

== Career ==
Jiang joined the faculty at the Department of Mathematics at the University of Minnesota in 1998 and became a full professor in 2004.

== Awards ==
Jiang was a recipient of a Sloan Research Fellowship in 2000, was inducted as a Fellow of the American Mathematical Society in 2019, and was awarded a Simons Fellow in 2024.

== Selected publications ==
- Degree 16 standard L-function of GSp(2)×GSp(2). Mem. Amer. Math. Soc. 123 (1996), no. 588, viii+196 pp.
- With Ilya Piatetski-Shapiro: Arithmeticity of discrete subgroups and automorphic forms. Geom. Funct. Anal. 8 (1998), no. 3, 586–605.
- With Wee Teck Gan and Nadya Gurevich: Cubic unipotent Arthur parameters and multiplicities of square integrable automorphic forms. Invent. Math. 149 (2002), no. 2, 225-265.
- With David Soudry: The local converse theorem for SO(2n+1) and applications. Annals of Mathematics (2) 157 (2003), no. 3, 743-806.
- With David Ginzburg and Stephen Rallis: On the nonvanishing of the central value of the Rankin-Selberg L-functions. J. Amer. Math. Soc. 17 (2004), no. 3, 679–722.
- On the fundamental automorphic L-functions of SO(2n+1). Int. Math. Res. Not. 2006, Art. ID 64069, 26 pp.
- With Jian-Shu Li and Shou-Wu Zhang: Periods and distribution of cycles on Hilbert modular varieties. Pure Appl. Math. Q. 2 (2006), no. 1, Special Issue: In honor of John H. Coates. Part 1, 219–277.
- With Binyong Sun and Chen-Bo Zhu: Uniqueness of Bessel models: the Archimedean case. Geom. Funct. Anal. 20 (2010), no. 3, 690–709.
- Automorphic integral transforms for classical groups I: Endoscopy correspondences. Automorphic forms and related geometry: assessing the legacy of I. I. Piatetski-Shapiro, 179–242, Contemp. Math., 614, Amer. Math. Soc., Providence, RI, 2014.
- With Chufeng Nien and Shaun Stevens: Towards the Jacquet conjecture on the local converse problem for p-adic GLn. J. Eur. Math. Soc. (JEMS) 17 (2015), no. 4, 991–1007.
- With Lei Zhang: Arthur parameters and cuspidal automorphic modules of classical groups. Annals of Mathematics (2) 191 (2020), no. 3, 739-827.
- With Baiying Liu and Bin Xu: A reciprocal branching problem for automorphic representations and global Vogan packets. J. Reine Angew. Math. 765 (2020), 249–277.
