= David Soudry =

Mathematician

- Born: 1956 (age 69–70)
- Education: Tel Aviv University
- Scientific career
- Fields: Mathematics
- Workplaces: Tel Aviv University; Institute for Advanced Study
- Thesis: The L and Epsilon Factors for Generic Representations of GSp(4,k)xGL(2,k) over a Local Non-Archimedean Field k (1983)
- Doctoral advisor: Ilya Piatetski-Shapiro

David Soudry (born 1956) is a professor of mathematics at Tel Aviv University working in number theory and automorphic forms.

== Career ==
Soudry was born in 1956. He received his PhD in mathematics from Tel Aviv University in 1983 under the supervision of Ilya Piatetski-Shapiro. From 1983 to 1984, he was a member of the Institute for Advanced Study. He is a professor of mathematics at Tel Aviv University.

== Research ==
Together with Stephen Rallis and David Ginzburg, Soudry wrote a series of papers about automorphic descent culminating in their book The descent map from automorphic representations of GL(n) to classical groups. Their automorphic descent method constructs an explicit inverse map to the (standard) Langlands functorial lift and has had major applications to the analysis of functoriality. Also, using the "Rallis tower property" from Rallis's 1984 paper on the Howe duality conjecture, they studied global exceptional correspondences and found new examples of functorial lifts.

== Selected publications ==
- Gelbart, Stephen; Rogawski, Jonathan; Soudry, David (1997). "Endoscopy, Theta-Liftings, and Period Integrals for the Unitary Group in Three Variables". Annals of Mathematics. 145 (3): 419. doi:10.2307/2951840. JSTOR 2951840. MR 1454699.
- Jiang, Dihua; Soudry, David (2003). "The local converse theorem for SO(2n + 1) and applications". Annals of Mathematics. 157 (3): 743–806. arXiv:math/0402265. doi:10.4007/annals.2003.157.743. ISSN 0003-486X. MR 1983781.
- Ginzburg, David; Rallis, Stephen; Soudry, David (1997). "A tower of theta correspondences for G_{2}". Duke Mathematical Journal. 88 (3): 537–624. doi:10.1215/S0012-7094-97-08821-9. ISSN 0012-7094. MR 1455531.
- Ginzburg, David; Rallis, Stephen; Soudry, David (1999). "On Explicit Lifts of Cusp Forms from GL_{m} to Classical Groups". Annals of Mathematics. 150 (3): 807. arXiv:math/9911264. doi:10.2307/121057. JSTOR 121057. MR 1740991. S2CID 14223575.
- Ginzburg, David; Rallis, Stephen; Soudry, David (2011). The Descent Map from Automorphic Representations of GL(n) to Classical Groups. World Scientific. doi:10.1142/7742. ISBN 978-981-4304-98-6.
