= James Cogdell =

American mathematician (born 1953)

James Wesley Cogdell (born 22 September 1953) is an American mathematician.

== Education and career ==
He graduated from Yale University in 1977 with a bachelor's degree and in 1981 with a Ph.D. His doctoral dissertation Arithmetic Quotients of the Complex 2-Ball and Modular Forms of Nebentypus was supervised by Ilya Piatetski-Shapiro. Cogdell was a postdoc at the University of Maryland and the University of California, Los Angeles. He was from 1982 to 1988 an assistant professor at Rutgers University. At Oklahoma State University he was from 1987 to 1988 assistant professor, from 1988 to 1994 an associate professor, and from 1994 to 2004 a full professor (from 1999 as Southwestern Bell Professor, from 2000 as Regents Professor, and from 2003 as Vaughan Foundation Professor). In 2004 he became a professor at Ohio State University.

In autumn 1983 and for the academic year 1999–2000 he was at the Institute for Advanced Study. He has held visiting positions at Hebrew University of Jerusalem, at the University of Iowa, at Fields Institute, and at the Erwin Schrödinger International Institute for Mathematical Physics (where he gave the 2009 Erwin Schrödinger Lecture).

Cogdell works on L-functions, automorphic forms (within the context of the Langlands program), and analytic number theory. In collaboration with Piatetski-Shapiro, he proved converse theorems for L-functions for the general linear groups $GL_n$. The goal is to characterize the L-functions that originate from automorphic forms. For $GL_2$ this was solved by Hervé Jacquet and Robert Langlands and for $GL_3$ by Jacquet, Piatetski-Shapiro and Joseph Shalika. The problem goes back to Erich Hecke's characterization of the Dirichlet series that come from modular forms.

In 2002 Cogdell was, with Piatetski-Shapiro, an Invited Speaker with talk Converse theorems, functoriality and applications to number theory at the International Congress of Mathematicians in Beijing. He was an editor, with Simon Gindikin and Peter Sarnak, for Selected Works of Ilya Piatetski-Shapiro (2000, AMS).

Cogdell was elected in 2012 a Fellow of the American Mathematical Society and in 2016 a Fellow of the American Association for the Advancement of Science.

== Selected publications ==
- with Ilya Piatetski-Shapiro: The Arithmetic and Spectral Analysis of Poincaré Series (= Perspectives in Mathematics. 13). Academic Press, Boston MA etc. 1990, ISBN 0-12-178590-4; 2014 pbk reprint
- with Ilya I. Piatetski-Shapiro: Converse theorems for $GL_n$. (in 2 parts) Part I: Publications Mathématiques de l'IHÉS. vol. 79, no. 1, 1994, pp. 157–214, (online); Part II: Journal für die reine und angewandte Mathematik. vol. 507, 1999, pp. 165–188, doi:10.1515/crll.1999.507.165.
- Analytic theory of $L$-functions for $GL_n$. Langlands conjectures for $GL_n$. Dual groups and Langlands functoriality. In: Joseph Bernstein, Stephen Gelbart: An Introduction to the Langlands Program. Birkhäuser, Boston MA etc. 2003, ISBN 0-8176-3211-5, pp. 197–268.
- with Henry H. Kim, M. Ram Murty: Lectures on Automorphic $L$-Functions (= Fields Institute Monographs. 20). American Mathematical Society, Providence RI 2004, ISBN 0-8218-3516-5. Lectures on Automorphic $L$-Functions, AMS Bookstore
- with Henry H. Kim, Ilya I. Piatetski-Shapiro, and Freydoon Shahidi. "Functoriality for the classical groups." Publications Mathématiques de l'IHÉS 99 (2004): 163–233.
- as editor with Dihua Jiang, Stephen S. Kudla, David Soudry, Robert J. Stanton: Automorphic Representations, $L$-functions and Applications. Progress and Prospects. Proceedings of a Conference Honoring Steve Rallis on the Occasion of his 60th Birthday. The Ohio State University, March 27–30, 2003 (= Ohio State University Mathematical Research Institute Publications. 11). De Gruyter, Berlin etc. 2005, ISBN 3-11-017939-3.
- $L$-functions and Converse Theorems for $GL_n$. In: Peter Sarnak, Freydoon Shahidi (eds.): Automorphic Forms and Applications (= IAS/Park City Mathematics Series. 12). American Mathematical Society, Providence RI 2007, ISBN 978-0-8218-2873-1, pp. 97–177.
- as editor with Jens Funke, Michael Rapoport, Tonghai Yang: Arithmetic Geometry and Automorphic Forms (= Advanced Lectures in Mathematics. 19). International Press etc., Somerville MA etc. 2011, ISBN 978-1-57146-229-9.
  - pp. 55–90: with Freydoon Shahidi: Some Generalized Functionals and their Bessel Functions.
- as editor with Freydoon Shahidi, David Soubry (eds.): Automorphic Forms and Related Geometry: Assessing the Legacy of I. I. Piatetski-Shapiro. Conference on Automorphic Forms and Related Geometry: Assessing the Legacy of I. I. Piatetski-Shapiro, April 23–27, 2012, Yale University, New Haven, CT (= Contemporary Mathematics. 614). American Mathematical Society, Providence RI 2014, ISBN 978-0-8218-9394-4. Automorphic Forms and Related Geometry: Assessing the Legacy of I. I. Piatetski-Shapiro, AMS Bookstore
  - pp. 31–51: Piatetski-Shapiro’s Work on Converse Theorems.
  - pp. 375–386: with Freydoon Shahidi, T.-L. Tsai: On Stability of Root Numbers.
- $L$-functions and non-abelian class field theory, from Artin to Langlands. In: Della Dumbaugh, Joachim Schwermer: Emil Artin and Beyond – Class Field Theory and $L$-functions. With Contributions by James Cogdell and Robert Langlands. European Mathematical Society, Zürich 2015, ISBN 978-3-03719-146-0, pp. 127–161.
  - Emil Artin and Beyond–Class Field Theory and $L$-functions, AMS Bookstore European Mathematical Society Publishing House
