= Symplectic frame bundle =

Canonical subbundle

In symplectic geometry, the symplectic frame bundle of a given symplectic manifold $(M, \omega)\,$ is the canonical principal ${\mathrm {Sp}}(n,{\mathbb R})$-subbundle $\pi_{\mathbf R}\colon{\mathbf R}\to M\,$ of the tangent frame bundle $\mathrm FM\,$ consisting of linear frames which are symplectic with respect to $\omega\,$. In other words, an element of the symplectic frame bundle is a linear frame $u\in\mathrm{F}_{p}(M)\,$ at point $p\in M\, ,$ i.e. an ordered basis $({\mathbf e}_1,\dots,{\mathbf e}_n,{\mathbf f}_1,\dots,{\mathbf f}_n)\,$ of tangent vectors at $p\,$ of the tangent vector space $T_{p}(M)\,$, satisfying

$\omega_{p}({\mathbf e}_j,{\mathbf e}_k)=\omega_{p}({\mathbf f}_j,{\mathbf f}_k)=0\,$ and $\omega_{p}({\mathbf e}_j,{\mathbf f}_k)=\delta_{jk}\,$

for $j,k=1,\dots,n\,$. For $p\in M\,$, each fiber ${\mathbf R}_p\,$ of the principal ${\mathrm {Sp}}(n,{\mathbb R})$-bundle $\pi_{\mathbf R}\colon{\mathbf R}\to M\,$ is the set of all symplectic bases of $T_{p}(M)\,$.

The symplectic frame bundle $\pi_{\mathbf R}\colon{\mathbf R}\to M\,$, a subbundle of the tangent frame bundle $\mathrm FM\,$, is an example of reductive G-structure on the manifold $M\,$.

== See also ==
- Metaplectic group
- Metaplectic structure
- Symplectic basis
- Symplectic structure
- Symplectic geometry
- Symplectic group
- Symplectic spinor bundle

== Books ==
- Habermann, Katharina; Habermann, Lutz (2006), Introduction to Symplectic Dirac Operators, Springer-Verlag, ISBN 978-3-540-33420-0
- da Silva, A.C., Lectures on Symplectic Geometry, Springer (2001). ISBN 3-540-42195-5. doi:10.1007/978-3-540-45330-7
- Maurice de Gosson: Symplectic Geometry and Quantum Mechanics (2006) Birkhäuser Verlag, Basel ISBN 3-7643-7574-4.
