= Symplectic basis =

In linear algebra, a standard symplectic basis is a basis ${\mathbf e}_i, {\mathbf f}_i$ of a symplectic vector space, which is a vector space with a nondegenerate alternating bilinear form $\omega$, such that $\omega({\mathbf e}_i, {\mathbf e}_j) = 0 = \omega({\mathbf f}_i, {\mathbf f}_j), \omega({\mathbf e}_i, {\mathbf f}_j) = \delta_{ij}$. A symplectic basis of a symplectic vector space always exists; it can be constructed by a procedure similar to the Gram–Schmidt process. The existence of the basis implies in particular that the dimension of a symplectic vector space is even if it is finite.

== See also ==
- Darboux theorem
- Symplectic frame bundle
- Symplectic spinor bundle
- Symplectic vector space
