= Cogdell =

Cogdell may refer to:

== People ==
- Corey Cogdell (born 1986), American trap shooter
- Homer Cogdell (1888–1956), American football player
- James Cogdell (born 1953), American mathematician
- John S. Cogdell, nineteenth century American sculptor, lawyer and public official

== Location ==
- Cogdell, Georgia, United States, a census-designated place
