= Bertram Kostant =

American Jewish mathematician

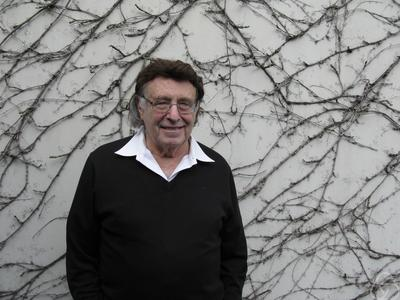
- Bertram Kostant at a workshop on “Enveloping Algebras and Geometric Representation Theory” in Oberwolfach, 2009
- Born: May 24, 1928; Brooklyn, New York, U.S.
- Died: February 2, 2017 (aged 88); Roslindale, Massachusetts, U.S.
- Education: Purdue University (BS); University of Chicago (PhD)
- Known for: Kostant's convexity theorem Kostant partition function Kostant polynomial Geometric quantization Kostant–Parthasarathy–Ranga Rao–Varadarajan determinants Hochschild-Kostant-Rosenberg theorem
- Awards: Wigner Medal (2016)
- Scientific career
- Fields: Mathematics
- Workplaces: Massachusetts Institute of Technology; University of California, Berkeley
- Thesis: Representations of a Lie algebra and its enveloping algebra on a Hilbert space
- Doctoral advisor: Irving Segal
- Doctoral students: Marjorie Batchelor; James Lepowsky; Arlie Petters; Stephen Rallis; James Harris Simons; Birgit Speh; Moss Sweedler; David Vogan

Bertram Kostant (May 24, 1928 – February 2, 2017) was an American mathematician who worked in representation theory, differential geometry, and mathematical physics.

== Early life and education ==
Kostant grew up in New York City, where he graduated from Stuyvesant High School in 1945. He went on to obtain an undergraduate degree in mathematics from Purdue University in 1950. He earned his Ph.D. from the University of Chicago in 1954, under the direction of Irving Segal, where he wrote a dissertation on representations of Lie groups.

== Career in mathematics ==
After time at the Institute for Advanced Study, Princeton University, and the University of California, Berkeley, he joined the faculty at the Massachusetts Institute of Technology, where he remained until his retirement in 1993. Kostant's work has involved representation theory, Lie groups, Lie algebras, homogeneous spaces, differential geometry and mathematical physics, particularly symplectic geometry. He has given several lectures on the Lie group E8. He has been one of the principal developers of the theory of geometric quantization. His introduction of the theory of prequantization has led to the theory of quantum Toda lattices. The Kostant partition function is named after him. With Gerhard Hochschild and Alex F. T. W. Rosenberg, he is one of the namesakes of the Hochschild–Kostant–Rosenberg theorem which describes the Hochschild homology of some algebras.

His students include James Harris Simons, James Lepowsky, Moss Sweedler, David Vogan, and Birgit Speh. At present he has more than 100 mathematical descendants.

== Awards and honors ==
Kostant was a Guggenheim Fellow in 1959-60 (in Paris), and a Sloan Fellow in 1961-63. In 1962 he was elected to the American Academy of Arts and Sciences, and in 1978 to the National Academy of Sciences. In 1982 he was a fellow of the Sackler Institute for Advanced Studies at Tel Aviv University. In 1990 he was awarded the Steele Prize of the American Mathematical Society, in recognition of his 1975 paper, “On the existence and irreducibility of certain series of representations.”

In 2001, Kostant was a Chern Lecturer and Chern Visiting Professor at Berkeley. He received honorary degrees from the University of Córdoba in Argentina in 1989, the University of Salamanca in Spain in 1992, and Purdue University in 1997. The latter, from his alma mater, was an honorary Doctor of Science degree, citing his fundamental contributions to mathematics and the inspiration he and his work provided to generations of researchers.

In May 2008, the Pacific Institute for Mathematical Sciences hosted a conference: “Lie Theory and Geometry: the Mathematical Legacy of Bertram Kostant,” at the University of British Columbia, celebrating the life and work of Kostant in his 80th year. In 2012, he was elected to the inaugural class of fellows of the American Mathematical Society. In the last year of his life, Kostant traveled to Rio de Janeiro for the Colloquium on Group Theoretical Methods in Physics, where he received the prestigious Wigner Medal, “for his fundamental contributions to representation theory that led to new branches of mathematics and physics.”

== Selected publications ==
- Kostant, Bertram (1955). "Holonomy and the Lie algebra of infinitesimal motions of a Riemannian manifold". Trans. Amer. Math. Soc. 80 (2): 528–542. doi:10.1090/S0002-9947-1955-0084825-8.
- Kostant, Bertram (1959). "A formula for the multiplicity of a weight". Trans. Amer. Math. Soc. 93 (6): 53–73. doi:10.1090/S0002-9947-1959-0109192-6. PMC 528626. PMID 16590246.
- Kostant, Bertram (1961). "Lie algebra cohomology and the generalized Borel-Weil theorem" (PDF). Annals of Mathematics. 74 (2): 329–387. doi:10.2307/1970237. hdl:2027/mdp.39015095258318. JSTOR 1970237.
- Kostant, Bertram (1963). "Lie group representations on polynomial rings". American Journal of Mathematics. 85 (3): 327–404. doi:10.2307/2373130. JSTOR 2373130.
- Kostant, Bertram (1969). "On the existence and irreducibility of certain series of representations". Bulletin of the American Mathematical Society. 75 (4): 627–642. doi:10.1090/S0002-9904-1969-12235-4.
- Kostant, Bertram (1970). "Quantization and unitary representations". In: Lectures in modern analysis and applications III. Lecture Notes in Mathematics 170. Vol. 170. pp. 87–208. doi:10.1007/BFb0079068. ISBN 978-3-540-05284-5.
- with Louis Auslander: Auslander, L.; Kostant, B. (1971). "Polarization and unitary representations of solvable Lie groups". Inventiones Mathematicae. 14 (4): 255–354. Bibcode:1971InMat..14..255A. doi:10.1007/BF01389744. S2CID 122009744.
- with Stephen Rallis: Kostant, B.; Rallis, S. (1971). "Orbits and representations associated with symmetric spaces". American Journal of Mathematics. 93 (3): 753–809. doi:10.2307/2373470. JSTOR 2373470.
- Kostant, Bertram (1973). "On convexity, the Weyl group and the Iwasawa decomposition". Annales Scientifiques de l'École Normale Supérieure. 6 (4): 413–455. doi:10.24033/asens.1254.
- Kostant, Bertram (1977). "Graded manifolds, graded Lie theory, and prequantization". In: Differential Geometrical Methods in Mathematical Physics. Lecture Notes in Math 570. Vol. 570. pp. 177–306. doi:10.1007/Bfb0087788. ISBN 978-3-540-08068-8.
- Kostant, Bertram (1978). "On Whittaker vectors and representation theory". Inventiones Mathematicae. 48 (2): 101–184. Bibcode:1978InMat..48..101K. doi:10.1007/BF01390249. S2CID 122765132.
- with David Kazhdan and Shlomo Sternberg: Kazhdan, D.; Kostant, B.; Sternberg, S. (1978). "Hamiltonian group actions and dynamical systems of Calogero type". Communications on Pure and Applied Mathematics. 31 (4): 481–507. doi:10.1002/cpa.3160310405.
- Kostant, Bertram (1979). "The solution to a generalized Toda lattice and representation theory". Advances in Mathematics. 34 (3): 195–338. doi:10.1016/0001-8708(79)90057-4.
- with Shrawan Kumar: Kostant, Bertram; Kumar, Shrawan (1986). "The nil Hecke ring and cohomology of GP for a Kac-Moody group G". Advances in Mathematics. 62 (3): 187–237. doi:10.1016/0001-8708(86)90101-5. PMC 323118. PMID 16593661.
- with Shlomo Sternberg: Kostant, Bertram; Sternberg, Shlomo (1987), "Symplectic reduction, BRS cohomology, and infinite-dimensional Clifford algebras", Annals of Physics, 176 (1): 49–113, Bibcode:1987AnPhy.176...49K, doi:10.1016/0003-4916(87)90178-3
- "On Laguerre polynomials, Bessel functions, Hankel transform and a series in the unitary dual of the simply-connected covering group of $\mbox{SL}(2,\mathbb{R})$". Represent. Theory. 4: 181–224. 2000. doi:10.1090/S1088-4165-00-00096-0.
- with Gerhard Hochschild and Alex Rosenberg: Hochschild, G.; Kostant, Bertram; Rosenberg, Alex (2009). "Differential forms on regular affine algebras". In: Collected Papers. New York: Springer. pp. 265–290. doi:10.1007/b94535_14. ISBN 978-0-387-09582-0. S2CID 54088721. (Reprinted from Trans. Amer. Math. Soc., vol. 102, no. 3, March 1962, pp. 383–408)
- Kostant, Bertram (2009). "The principal three-dimensional subgroup and the Betti numbers of a complex simple Lie group". In: Collected Papers. pp. 130–189. doi:10.1007/b94535_11. ISBN 978-0-387-09582-0. (Reprinted from the Amer. J. Math., vol. 81, no. 4, Oct. 1959)

== See also ==
- Chern's conjecture (affine geometry)
- Supermanifold
- Symplectic spinor bundle
