= Douglas Ulmer =

American mathematician

Douglas Ulmer is an American mathematician who works in algebraic geometry and number theory. He is a professor and mathematics department head at the University of Arizona.

== Education ==
Ulmer did his undergraduate study at Princeton University. In 1987, he received his PhD at Brown University, where his advisor was Benedict Hyman Gross; his thesis was titled The Arithmetic of Universal Elliptic Modular Curves.

== Academic career ==
Ulmer was a C. L. E. Moore instructor at the Massachusetts Institute of Technology in 1987. In 1997 he was among the founders of the Southwest Center for Arithmetic Geometry at the University of Arizona. In 2009, he moved to the Georgia Institute of Technology, where he became Chair of the School of Mathematics. He returned to the University of Arizona in 2017.

Since 2014, he has served on the editorial board of the Journal de Théorie des Nombres de Bordeaux.

== Recognition ==
Ulmer was elected as a Fellow of the American Mathematical Society, in the 2025 class of fellows.
