= Birgit Speh =

American mathematician

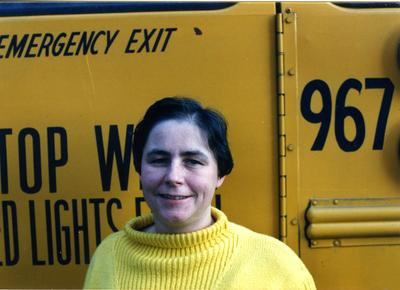
- Born: 1949 (age 76–77)
- Citizenship: United States
- Education: Massachusetts Institute of Technology
- Known for: Lie groups
- Awards: Fellow of the American Mathematical Society
- Scientific career
- Fields: Mathematics
- Workplaces: Cornell University
- Thesis: Some Results on Principal Series of GL(n,R) (1977)
- Doctoral advisor: Bertram Kostant

Birgit Speh (born 1949) is a Distinguished Professor of Mathematics at Cornell University. She is known for her work in Lie groups, including Speh representations (also known as Speh's representations).

== Career ==
Speh received her Ph.D. from Massachusetts Institute of Technology in 1977. She was the first female mathematician to be given tenure by Cornell University, and the first to receive the title of Professor.

== Awards and honors ==
In 2012, Speh became a fellow of the American Mathematical Society. She was selected to give the 2020 AWM-AMS Emmy Noether Lecture at the 2020 Joint Mathematics Meetings.

== Selected publications ==
- Speh, Birgit; Vogan, David A. Jr. Reducibility of generalized principal series representations. Acta Math. 145 (1980)
- Speh, Birgit. Unitary representations of Gl(n,R) with nontrivial (g,K)-cohomology. Invent. Math. 71 (1983), no. 3, 443–465.
- Speh, Birgit. The unitary dual of Gl(3,R) and Gl(4,R). Math. Ann. 258 (1981/82), no. 2, 113–133.
