= Reductive dual pair =

In the mathematical field of representation theory, a reductive dual pair is a pair of subgroups (G, G′) of the isometry group Sp(W) of a symplectic vector space W, such that G is the centralizer of G′ in Sp(W) and vice versa, and these groups act reductively on W. Somewhat more loosely, one speaks of a dual pair whenever two groups are the mutual centralizers in a larger group, which is frequently a general linear group. The concept was introduced by Roger Howe in Howe (1979). Its strong ties with Classical Invariant Theory are discussed in Howe (1989a).

== Examples ==
- The full symplectic group G = Sp(W) and the two-element group G′, the center of Sp(W), form a reductive dual pair. The double centralizer property is clear from the way these groups were defined: the centralizer of the group G in G is its center, and the centralizer of the center of any group is the group itself. The group G′, consists of the identity transformation and its negative, and can be interpreted as the orthogonal group of a one-dimensional vector space. It emerges from the subsequent development of the theory that this pair is a first instance of a general family of dual pairs consisting of a symplectic group and an orthogonal group, which are known as type I irreducible reductive dual pairs.
- Let X be an n-dimensional vector space, Y be its dual, and W be the direct sum of X and Y. Then W can be made into a symplectic vector space in a natural way, so that (X, Y) is its lagrangian polarization. The group G is the general linear group GL(X), which acts tautologically on X and contragrediently on Y. The centralizer of G in the symplectic group is the group G′, consisting of linear operators on W that act on X by multiplication by a non-zero scalar λ and on Y by scalar multiplication by its inverse λ^{−1}. Then the centralizer of G′, is G, these two groups act completely reducibly on W, and hence form a reductive dual pair. The group G′, can be interpreted as the general linear group of a one-dimensional vector space. This pair is a member of a family of dual pairs consisting of general linear groups known as type II irreducible reductive dual pairs.

== Structure theory and classification ==
The notion of a reductive dual pair makes sense over any field F, which we assume to be fixed throughout. Thus W is a symplectic vector space over F.

If W_{1} and W_{2} are two symplectic vector spaces and (G_{1}, G′_{1}), (G_{2}, G′_{2}) are two reductive dual pairs in the corresponding symplectic groups, then we may form a new symplectic vector space W = W_{1} ⊕ W_{2} and a pair of groups G = G_{1} × G_{2}, G′ = G′_{1} × G′,_{2} acting on W by isometries. It turns out that (G, G′) is a reductive dual pair. A reductive dual pair is called reducible if it can be obtained in this fashion from smaller groups, and irreducible otherwise. A reducible pair can be decomposed into a direct product of irreducible ones, and for many purposes, it is enough to restrict one's attention to the irreducible case.

Several classes of reductive dual pairs had appeared earlier in the work of André Weil. Roger Howe proved a classification theorem, which states that in the irreducible case, those pairs exhaust all possibilities. An irreducible reductive dual pair (G, G′) in Sp(W) is said to be of type II if there is a lagrangian subspace X in W that is invariant under both G and G′, and of type I otherwise.

An archetypical irreducible reductive dual pair of type II consists of a pair of general linear groups and arises as follows. Let U and V be two vector spaces over F, X = U ⊗_{F} V be their tensor product, and Y = Hom_{F}(X, F) its dual. Then the direct sum W = X ⊕ Y can be endowed with a symplectic form such that X and Y are lagrangian subspaces, and the restriction of the symplectic form to X × Y ⊂ W × W coincides with the pairing between the vector space X and its dual Y. If G = GL(U) and G′ = GL(V), then both these groups act linearly on X and Y, the actions preserve the symplectic form on W, and (G, G′) is an irreducible reductive dual pair. Note that X is an invariant lagrangian subspace, hence this dual pair is of type II.

An archetypical irreducible reductive dual pair of type I consists of an orthogonal group and a symplectic group and is constructed analogously. Let U be an orthogonal vector space and V be a symplectic vector space over F, and W = U ⊗_{F} V be their tensor product. The key observation is that W is a symplectic vector space whose bilinear form is obtained from the product of the forms on the tensor factors. Moreover, if G = O(U) and G′ = Sp(V) are the isometry groups of U and V, then they act on W in a natural way, these actions are symplectic, and (G, G′) is an irreducible reductive dual pair of type I.

These two constructions produce all irreducible reductive dual pairs over an algebraically closed field F, such as the field C of complex numbers. In general, one can replace vector spaces over F by vector spaces over a division algebra D over F, and proceed similarly to above to construct an irreducible reductive dual pair of type II. For type I, one starts with a division algebra D with involution τ, a hermitian form on U, and a skew-hermitian form on V (both of them non-degenerate), and forms their tensor product over D, W = U ⊗_{D} V. Then W is naturally endowed with a structure of a symplectic vector space over F, the isometry groups of U and V act symplectically on W and form an irreducible reductive dual pair of type I. Roger Howe proved that, up to an isomorphism, any irreducible dual pair arises in this fashion. An explicit list for the case F = R appears in Howe (1989b).

== See also ==
- Howe correspondence between representations of elements of a reductive dual pair.
- Heisenberg group
- Metaplectic group
