= Waldspurger formula =

In representation theory, a branch of mathematics, the Waldspurger formula relates the special values of two L-functions of two related admissible irreducible representations. Let k be the base field, f be an automorphic form over k, π be the representation associated via the Jacquet–Langlands correspondence with f. Goro Shimura (1976) proved this formula when $k = \mathbb{Q}$ and f is a cusp form; Günter Harder made the same discovery at the same time in an unpublished paper. Marie-France Vignéras (1980) proved this formula when $k = \mathbb{Q}$ and f is a newform. Jean-Loup Waldspurger, for whom the formula is named, reproved and generalized the result of Vignéras in 1985 via a totally different method which was widely used thereafter by mathematicians to prove similar formulas.

== Statement ==
Let $k$ be a number field, $\mathbb{A}$ be its adele ring, $k^\times$ be the subgroup of invertible elements of $k$, $\mathbb{A}^\times$ be the subgroup of the invertible elements of $\mathbb{A}$, $\chi, \chi_1, \chi_2$ be three quadratic characters over $\mathbb{A}^\times/k^\times$, $G = \operatorname{SL}_2(k)$, $\mathcal{A}(G)$ be the space of all cusp forms over $G(k)\backslash G(\mathbb{A})$, $\mathcal{H}$ be the Hecke algebra of $G(\mathbb{A})$. Assume that, $\pi$ is an admissible irreducible representation from $G(\mathbb{A})$ to $\mathcal{A}(G)$, the central character of π is trivial, $\pi_\nu \sim \pi[h_\nu]$ when $\nu$ is an archimedean place, $A$ is a subspace of $\mathcal{A}(G)$ such that $\pi|_\mathcal{H} : \mathcal{H} \to A$. We suppose further that, $\varepsilon(\pi\otimes\chi, 1/2)$ is the Langlands $\varepsilon$-constant [ (Langlands 1970); (Deligne 1972) ] associated to $\pi$ and $\chi$ at $s = 1/2$. There is a $\gamma \in k^\times$ such that $k(\chi) = k(\sqrt{\gamma}\,)$.

Definition 1. The Legendre symbol $\left(\frac{\chi}{\pi}\right) = \varepsilon(\pi\otimes\chi, 1/2) \cdot \varepsilon(\pi, 1/2) \cdot \chi(-1).$

- Comment. Because all the terms in the right either have value +1, or have value −1, the term in the left can only take value in the set {+1, −1}.

Definition 2. Let $D_\chi$ be the discriminant of $\chi$.
$$p(\chi) = D_\chi^{1/2} \sum_{\nu\text{ archimedean}} \left\vert \gamma_\nu \right\vert_\nu^{h_\nu/2}.$$

Definition 3. Let $f_0, f_1 \in A$. $b(f_0, f_1) = \int_{x\in k^\times} f_0(x) \cdot \overline{f_1(x)} \, dx.$

Definition 4. Let $T$ be a maximal torus of $G$, $Z$ be the center of $G$, $\varphi \in A$.
$$\beta (\varphi, T) = \int_{t \in Z\backslash T} b(\pi (t)\varphi, \varphi) \,  dt .$$

- Comment. It is not obvious though, that the function $\beta$ is a generalization of the Gauss sum.

Let $K$ be a field such that $k(\pi)\subset K\subset\mathbb{C}$. One can choose a $K$-subspace $A^0$ of $A$ such that (i) $A = A^0 \otimes_K \mathbb{C}$; (ii) $(A^0)^{\pi(G)} = A^0$. De facto, there is only one such $A^0$ modulo homothety. Let $T_1, T_2$ be two maximal tori of $G$ such that $\chi_{T_1} = \chi_1$ and $\chi_{T_2} = \chi_2$. We can choose two elements $\varphi_1, \varphi_2$ of $A^0$ such that $\beta(\varphi_1, T_1) \neq 0$ and $\beta(\varphi_2, T_2) \neq 0$.

Definition 5. Let $D_1, D_2$ be the discriminants of $\chi_1, \chi_2$.

$$p(\pi, \chi_1, \chi_2) = D_1^{-1/2} D_2^{1/2} L(\chi_1, 1)^{-1} L(\chi_2, 1) L(\pi\otimes\chi_1, 1/2) L(\pi\otimes\chi_2, 1/2)^{-1} \beta(\varphi_1, T_1)^{-1} \beta(\varphi_2, T_2).$$

- Comment. When the $\chi_1 = \chi_2$, the right hand side of Definition 5 becomes trivial.

We take $\Sigma_f$ to be the set {all finite $k$-places $\nu \mid \pi_\nu$ doesn't map nonzero vectors invariant under the action of $\operatorname{GL}_2(k_\nu)$ to zero}, $\Sigma_s$ to be the set of (all $k$-places $\nu \mid \nu$ is real, or finite and special).

Theorem —Let $k = \mathbb{Q}$. We assume that, (i) $L(\pi\otimes\chi_2, 1/2) \neq 0$; (ii) for $\nu \in \Sigma_s$, $\left(\frac{\chi_{1, \nu}} {\pi_\nu}\right) = \left(\frac{\chi_{2, \nu}} {\pi_\nu}\right)$ . Then there is a constant $q \in \mathbb{Q}(\pi)$ such that
$$L(\pi\otimes\chi_1, 1/2)  L(\pi\otimes\chi_2, 1/2)^{-1} = q p(\chi_1) p(\chi_2)^{-1} \prod_{\nu \in \Sigma_f} p(\pi_\nu, \chi_{1, \nu}, \chi_{2, \nu})$$

Comments:

1. The formula in the theorem is the well-known Waldspurger formula. It is of global-local nature, in the left with a global part, in the right with a local part. By 2017, mathematicians often call it the classic Waldspurger's formula.
2. It is worthwhile to notice that when the two characters are equal, the formula can be greatly simplified.
3. [ (Waldspurger 1985), Thm 6, p. 241 ] When one of the two characters is $1$, Waldspurger's formula becomes much simpler. Without loss of generality, we can assume that, $\chi_1 = \chi$ and $\chi_2 = 1$. Then there is an element $q \in \mathbb{Q}(\pi)$ such that $L(\pi\otimes\chi, 1/2) L(\pi, 1/2)^{-1} = q D_{\chi}^{1/2}.$

== The case when F_{p}(T) and φ is a metaplectic cusp form ==
Let p be prime, $\mathbb{F}_p$ be the field with p elements, $R = \mathbb{F}_p[T], k = \mathbb{F}_p(T), k_\infty = \mathbb{F}_p((T^{-1})), o_\infty$ be the integer ring of $k_\infty, \mathcal{H} = \operatorname{PGL}_2(k_\infty)/\operatorname{PGL}_2(o_\infty), \Gamma = \operatorname{PGL}_2(R)$. Assume that, $N, D\in R$, D is squarefree of even degree and coprime to N, the prime factorization of $N$ is $\prod_\ell \ell^{\alpha_\ell}$. We take $\Gamma_0(N)$ to the set
$$\left\{ \begin{pmatrix} a & b \\ c & d \end{pmatrix} \in \Gamma \mid c \equiv 0 \bmod  N \right\},$$
$S_0(\Gamma_0(N))$ to be the set of all cusp forms of level N and depth 0. Suppose that, $\varphi, \varphi_1, \varphi_2 \in S_0(\Gamma_0(N))$.

Definition 1. Let $\left(\frac{c}{d} \right)$ be the Legendre symbol of c modulo d, $\widetilde{\mathrm{SL}}_2(k_\infty) = Mp_2(k_\infty)$. Metaplectic morphism
$$\eta : \operatorname{SL}_2(R) \to \widetilde{\mathrm{SL}}_2(k_\infty), \begin{pmatrix} a & b \\ c & d \end{pmatrix} \mapsto \left( \begin{pmatrix} a & b \\ c & d \end{pmatrix}, \left(\frac{c}{d} \right)\right).$$

Definition 2. Let $z = x + iy \in \mathcal{H}, d\mu = \frac{dx\,dy} {\left\vert y \right\vert^2}$. Petersson inner product
$$\langle \varphi_1, \varphi_2\rangle = [\Gamma : \Gamma_0(N)]^{-1} \int_{\Gamma_0(N) \backslash \mathcal{H}} \varphi_1(z) \overline{\varphi_2(z)} \, d\mu.$$

Definition 3. Let $n, P \in R$. Gauss sum
$$G_n(P) = \sum_{r \in R/PR} \left(\frac{r}{P} \right) e(rnT^2).$$

Let $\lambda_{\infty, \varphi}$ be the Laplace eigenvalue of $\varphi$. There is a constant $\theta \in \mathbb{R}$ such that $\lambda_{\infty, \varphi} = \frac { e^{-i\theta} + e^{i\theta} } { \sqrt{p} }.$

Definition 4. Assume that $v_\infty(a/b) = \deg(a) - \deg(b), \nu = v_\infty(y)$. Whittaker function
$$W_{0, i\theta}(y) = \begin{cases}
\frac{ \sqrt{p} } { e^{i\theta} - e^{-i\theta} } \left[ \left(\frac{ e^{i\theta} } { \sqrt{p} }\right)^{\nu - 1} - \left(\frac{ e^{-i\theta} } { \sqrt{p} }\right)^{\nu - 1} \right], & \text{when } \nu \geq 2; \\
0, & \text{otherwise}. \end{cases}$$

Definition 5. Fourier–Whittaker expansion
$$\varphi(z) = \sum_{ r \in R } \omega_\varphi(r) e(rxT^2) W_{0, i\theta}(y).$$
One calls $\omega_\varphi(r)$ the Fourier–Whittaker coefficients of $\varphi$.

Definition 6. Atkin–Lehner operator
$$W_{\alpha_\ell} = \begin{pmatrix} \ell^{\alpha_\ell} & b \\ N & \ell^{\alpha_\ell}d \end{pmatrix}$$
with $\ell^{2\alpha_\ell}d - bN = \ell^{\alpha_\ell}.$

Definition 7. Assume that, $\varphi$ is a Hecke eigenform. Atkin–Lehner eigenvalue
$$w_{\alpha_\ell, \varphi} = \frac{ \varphi(W_{\alpha_\ell}z) } { \varphi(z) }$$
with $w_{\alpha_\ell, \varphi} = \pm 1.$

Definition 8.
$$L(\varphi, s) = \sum_{r \in R \backslash \{0\} } \frac{ \omega_\varphi(r) } { \left \vert r \right \vert_p^s }.$$

Let $\widetilde{S}_0(\widetilde{\Gamma}_0(N))$ be the metaplectic version of $S_0(\Gamma_0(N))$, $\{ E_1, \ldots, E_d \}$ be a nice Hecke eigenbasis for $\widetilde{S}_0(\widetilde{\Gamma}_0(N))$ with respect to the Petersson inner product. We note the Shimura correspondence by $\operatorname{Sh}$.

Theorem [ (Altug & Tsimerman 2010), Thm 5.1, p. 60 ]. Suppose that $K_\varphi = \frac{1}{\sqrt{p} \left( \sqrt{p} - e^{-i\theta} \right) \left( \sqrt{p} - e^{i\theta} \right)}$, $\chi_D$ is a quadratic character with $\Delta(\chi_D) = D$. Then
$$\sum_{\operatorname{Sh}(E_i) = \varphi} \left\vert \omega_{E_i}(D) \right\vert_p^2 = \frac{ K_\varphi G_1(D) \left\vert D \right\vert_p^{-3/2} } { \langle \varphi, \varphi\rangle } L(\varphi \otimes \chi_D, 1/2) \prod_\ell \left( 1 + \left(\frac{ \ell^{\alpha_\ell} } D \right) w_{\alpha_\ell, \varphi} \right)\!.$$
