= Dipendra Prasad =

Indian mathematician (born 1960)

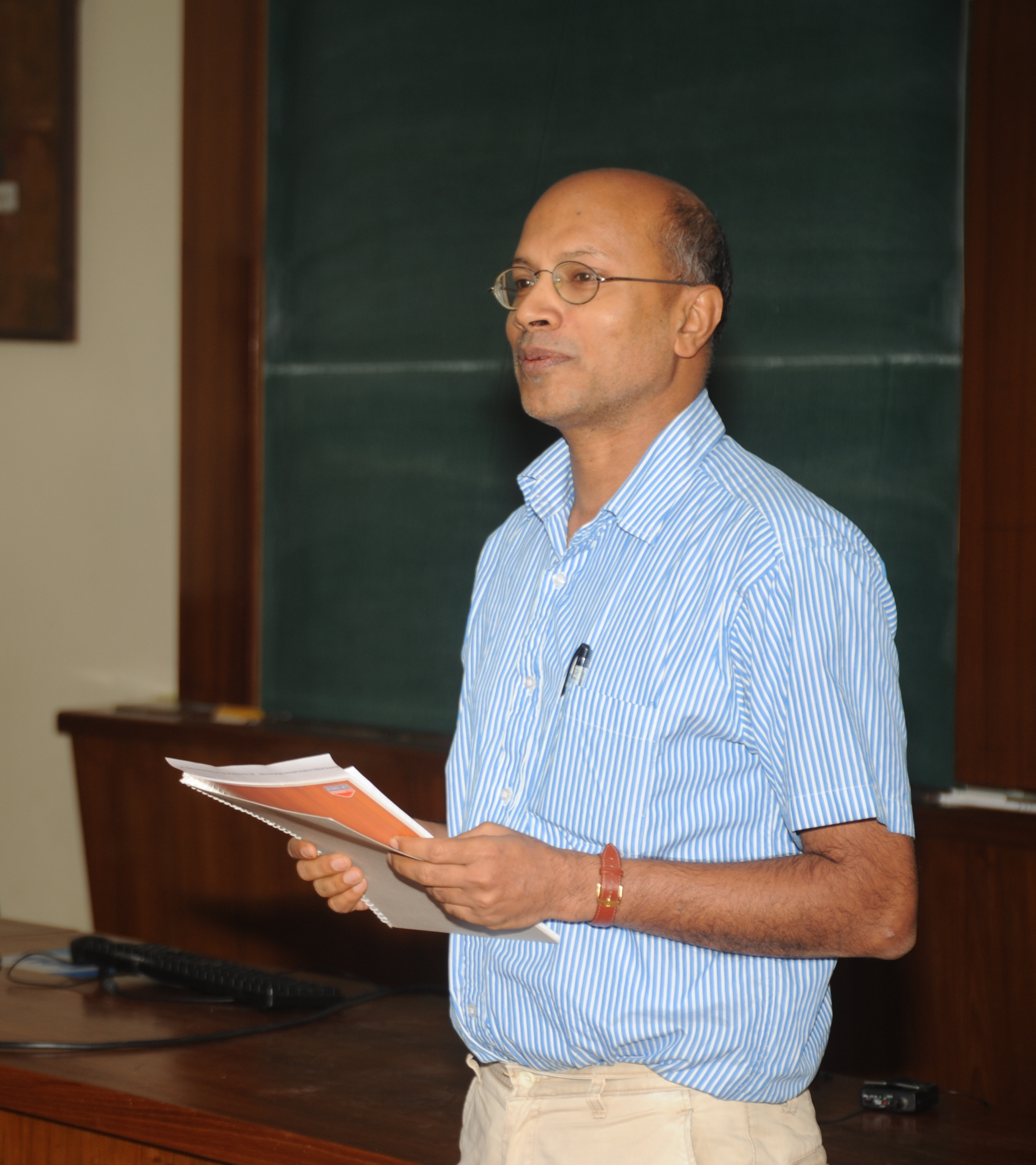
- Born: 22 March 1960 (age 66); Ghazipur Uttar Pradesh
- Citizenship: Indian
- Education: Harvard University; IIT Kanpur; St. Xavier's College, Mumbai
- Known for: Gan–Gross–Prasad conjecture
- Awards: S. S. Bhatnagar Prize (2002); JC Bose Fellowship 2010-2025; TWAS Prize (2019)
- Scientific career
- Fields: Mathematics
- Workplaces: Indian Institute of Technology Bombay; Tata Institute of Fundamental Research; Harish-Chandra Research Institute
- Doctoral advisor: Benedict Gross
- Website: https://sites.google.com/view/dipendra-prasad/home

Dipendra Prasad (born 1960) is an Indian mathematician. He is an Emeritus Fellow of mathematics at the Indian Institute of Technology Bombay. He is a number theorist known for his work in the areas of automorphic representations and the Gan–Gross–Prasad conjecture. He was the president of Commission for Developing Countries (CDC) of International Mathematical Union (2018–2022) and of Indian Math Society (2021–2022). Presently, he is the Chairman of the National Board of Higher Mathematics (NBHM) in India.

Two of his siblings, Gopal Prasad and Shrawan Kumar, are also mathematicians.

== Education ==
Prasad obtained his bachelor's degree from the St. Xavier's College, Mumbai in 1978 before moving to the Indian Institute of Technology Kanpur for a Masters which he completed in 1980. From 1980–1985, Prasad worked as a research scholar at the Tata Institute of Fundamental Research, Mumbai (TIFR Mumbai). He then completed his PhD under the supervision of Benedict Gross at Harvard, in 1989.

== Career ==
From 1989–1997, Prasad was a research assistant, fellow, and then reader at TIFR Mumbai. From 1992–1993, Prasad was a member of the Institute for Advanced Study. From 1994–2004, Prasad was an associate professor and then full professor at the Harish-Chandra Research Institute in Allahabad. From 2004 until 2019, Prasad was a professor at TIFR Mumbai. In 2019, Prasad moved to the Indian Institute of Technology Bombay.

== Awards ==
In recognition of his contributions, the Government of India awarded him the Shanti Swarup Bhatnagar Prize in mathematical sciences for 2002. In 2010 he was awarded the JC Bose of the Department of Science and Technology, New Delhi. He is also a recipient of the Swarna Jayanti Fellowship in 1999. He was Invited Speaker on the International Congress of Mathematicians 2018 in Rio de Janeiro in Section 7 (Lie Groups and Generalizations) with the talk 'Ext-analogues of branching laws'.

=== List of awards and honours ===
- Fellowship of TWAS (2023).
- TWAS Prize (2019), The World Academy of Sciences
- Invited speaker at ICM(2018)
- Jean-Morlet Chair, Centre International de Rencontres Mathématiques (2016)
- Srinivasa Ramanujan Birth Centenary Award of The Indian Science Congress Association (ISCA), 2005.
- Fellow, Indian National Science Academy (2003).
- Shanti Swarup Bhatnagar Prize for Science and Technology, 2002.
- Fellow of The National Academy of Sciences, India (1997).
- Fellow, Indian Academy of Sciences (1995).

== Selected publications ==
- Prasad, Dipendra (1990). "Trilinear forms for representations of $\mathrm{GL}(2)$ and local $\varepsilon$-factors". Compositio Mathematica. 75: 1–46.
- Gross, Benedict H.; Prasad, Dipendra (1992). "On the decomposition of a representation of $SO_n$ when restricted to $SO_{n-1}$". Canadian Journal of Mathematics. 44: 974–1002. doi:10.4153/cjm-1992-060-8.
- Prasad, Dipendra; Ramakrishnan, Dinakar (2012). "On the self-dual representations of division algebras over local fields". American Journal of Mathematics. 134 (3): 749–772. arXiv:0807.0240. doi:10.1353/ajm.2012.0017. S2CID 15266018.
- Gan, Wee Teck; Gross, Benedict H.; Prasad, Dipendra (2012). "Symplectic local root numbers, central critical L-values, and restriction problems in the representation theory of classical groups". Sur les conjectures de Gross et Prasad. Paris: Astérisque (Societé mathématique de France). pp. 1–109. ISBN 978-2-85629-348-5. OCLC 827954844.
- Prasad, Dipendra (2018). "Ext-analogues of branching laws". Proceedings of the International Congress of Mathematicians. Vol. II. Invited lectures. Rio de Janeiro: World Scientific Publishing, Hackensack, NJ. pp. 1367–1392. arXiv:1306.2729. doi:10.1142/9789813272880_0101.
- Prasad, Dipendra (2017). "A refined notion of arithmetically equivalent number fields, and curves with isomorphic Jacobians". Advances in Mathematics. 312: 198–208. arXiv:1409.3173. doi:10.1016/j.aim.2017.03.017.
- Prasad, Dipendra (2019). "A mod-p Artin–Tate conjecture, and generalizing the Herbrand–Ribet theorem". Pacific Journal of Mathematics. 303 (1): 299–316. arXiv:1703.01563. doi:10.2140/pjm.2019.303.299. S2CID 119150809.
- Prasad, Dipendra (2019). "Generic representations for symmetric spaces". Advances in Mathematics. 348: 378–411. arXiv:1802.01397. doi:10.1016/j.aim.2019.03.016. S2CID 119305415.
- Gan, Wee Teck; Gross, Benedict H.; Prasad, Dipendra (2020). "Branching laws for classical groups: the non-tempered case". Compositio Mathematica. 156 (11): 2298–2367. arXiv:1911.02783. doi:10.1112/S0010437X20007496. S2CID 207847322.
- Nair, Arvind N.; Prasad, Dipendra (2021). "Cohomological representations for real reductive groups". Journal of the London Mathematical Society. 104 (4): 1505–1571. arXiv:1904.00694. doi:10.1112/jlms.12468. ISSN 0024-6107. S2CID 90262556.
