= Benedict Gross =

American mathematician (1950–2025)

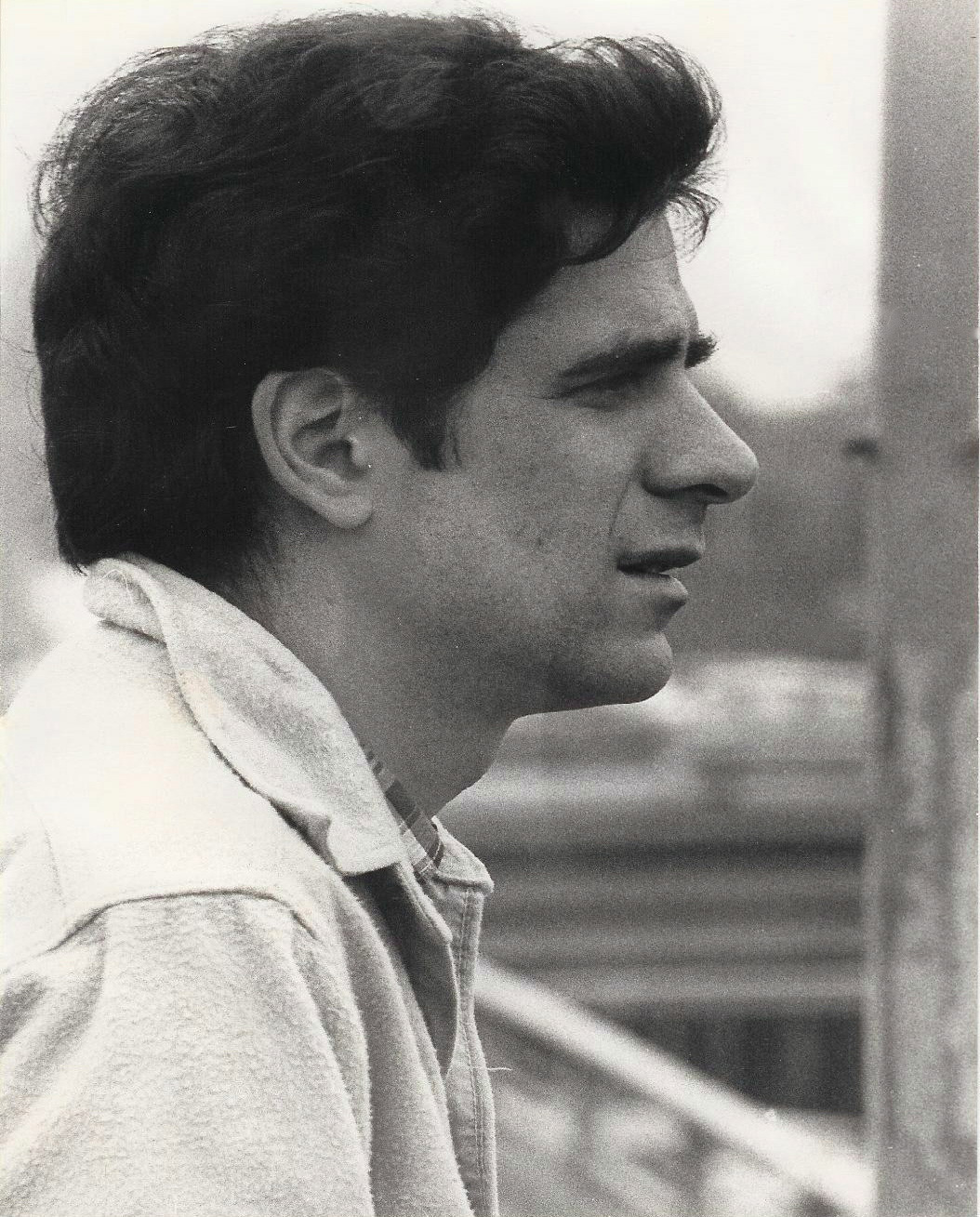
- Gross in Montrouge, France, c. 1977–79

Dean of Harvard College
- In office July 1, 2003 – August 31, 2007
- Preceded by: Harry R. Lewis
- Succeeded by: David Pilbeam (acting); Evelynn M. Hammonds

Personal details
- Born: Benedict Hyman Gross; June 22, 1950 South Orange, New Jersey, U.S.
- Died: December 19, 2025 (aged 75) San Diego, California, U.S.
- Spouse: Jill P. Mesirov (m. 1982)
- Children: 2
- Relatives: Avrum Gross (brother); Al Gross (nephew)
- Education: Harvard University (BA, PhD); University of Oxford (M.Sc.)
- Scientific career
- Education: Harvard University; Oxford University
- Known for: Gross–Zagier theorem; Gan–Gross–Prasad conjecture
- Awards: List of awards: MacArthur Fellowship (1986); Cole Prize (1987); Fellow of the American Academy of Arts and Sciences (1992); Member of the National Academy of Sciences (2004); Member of the American Philosophical Society (2017)
- Fields: Mathematics
- Workplaces: Harvard University; UC San Diego
- Thesis: Arithmetic on Elliptic Curves with Complex Multiplication (1978)
- Doctoral advisor: John Tate
- Doctoral students: List of students: Henri Darmon; Noam Elkies; Jessica Fintzen; Susan Goldstine; Rhonda Hatcher; Dipendra Prasad; Wee Teck Gan; Douglas Ulmer

Benedict Hyman Gross (June 22, 1950 – December 19, 2025) was an American mathematician who was a professor at the University of California, San Diego, the George Vasmer Leverett Professor of Mathematics Emeritus at Harvard University, and Dean of Harvard College.

Gross is known for his work in number theory, particularly the Gross–Zagier theorem on L-functions of elliptic curves, and related topics in algebraic geometry, automorphic forms, and representation theory. He received a MacArthur Fellowship in 1986 and a Cole Prize in 1987. He was a fellow of the American Academy of Arts and Sciences, a fellow of the American Philosophical Society, and an elected member of the National Academy of Sciences.

== Life and career ==
=== Early life and education ===
Benedict Hyman Gross was born on June 22, 1950, in South Orange, New Jersey, to Joel and Terry Gross. His father, Joel Gross, was born in Jersey City to Austrian immigrants who had moved to the United States as children. Joel Gross was a lawyer in Newark and was active in Jewish civic and philanthropic organizations. Terry Gross (née Stavisky) was born in New York City to Polish immigrants who had also moved to the United States as teenagers. Benedict Gross had two siblings, Ruth Gross Picker and Avrum Gross. Al Gross was his nephew.

Gross and his family moved to Santa Monica, California, at the age of 5, before returning to New Jersey during second grade. He attended West Orange High School, but transferred out after his freshman year. Gross graduated from The Pingry School, a leading independent school in New Jersey, in 1967 as the valedictorian.

He initially studied physics at Harvard University, deterred from mathematics because he thought that his classmates were better prepared than he was, but switched to mathematics in his sophomore year after enjoying the Math 55 course that was taught by Andrew M. Gleason. In 1971, he graduated Phi Beta Kappa from Harvard University.

Gross studied music in Africa and Asia, and then moved to Oxford University as a Marshall Scholar where he studied history, sociology, and mathematics. He received an M.Sc. from Oxford University in 1974, and then returned to Harvard, where he received his Ph.D. in mathematics in 1978 under the supervision of John Tate.

=== Career ===
Gross was an assistant professor at Princeton University from 1978 to 1982, a maître de conférences at Université de Paris VII in 1980, and an associate professor at Brown University from 1982 to 1985. Gross became a tenured professor at Harvard University in 1985 and became the George Vasmer Leverett Professor at Harvard University in 1988. He served as Dean of Undergraduate Education from 2002 to 2003 and as the Dean of Harvard College from 2003 to 2007. He retired from Harvard University as a professor emeritus and joined the University of California, San Diego, as a professor in 2016.

He was the mathematical consultant for the 1980 film It's My Turn containing the scene in which actress Jill Clayburgh, portraying a mathematics professor, impeccably proves the snake lemma. Gross was a member of the Board of Trustees of the Institute for Advanced Study from 2012 to 2017 and the executive committee of the International Mathematical Union from 2015 to 2019. He joined the Board of Directors of Scripps Research in 2018.

== Research ==
Gross's work spanned topics in number theory, algebraic geometry, modular forms, and group representations. His work with Don Zagier on the Gross–Zagier formula in 1986 has been influential in modern number theory. It describes the height of Heegner points in terms of a derivative of the L-function of elliptic curves and led to breakthroughs on the class number problem of Carl Friedrich Gauss.

== Personal life and death ==
Gross first met his wife Jill P. Mesirov at a party hosted by Robert Langlands. They married in 1982 and had two sons.

He was diagnosed with testicular cancer when he was an undergraduate at Harvard University, a likely effect of his mother having been prescribed diethylstilbestrol during pregnancy to prevent miscarriage. He received radiation therapy to prevent recurrence and had several major abdominal surgeries to deal with issues caused by this radiation over his lifetime. Gross died on December 19, 2025, at the age of 75, after a long illness.

== Awards and honors ==
Gross received a MacArthur Fellowship in 1986. Gross, Zagier, and Dorian M. Goldfeld won the Cole Prize of the American Mathematical Society in 1987 for their work on the Gross–Zagier formula and the Gauss class number problem. In 2012, he became a fellow of the American Mathematical Society.

He was elected as a fellow of the American Academy of Arts and Sciences in 1992 and as a member of the National Academy of Sciences in 2004. He was elected to the American Philosophical Society in 2017.

== Major publications ==
- Gross, Benedict H.; Harris, Joe (1981). "Real algebraic curves". Annales scientifiques de l'École normale supérieure. 14 (2): 157–182. doi:10.24033/asens.1401. ISSN 0012-9593.
- Gross, Benedict H.; Zagier, Don B. (1986). "Heegner points and derivatives of L-series". Inventiones Mathematicae. 84 (2): 225–320. Bibcode:1986InMat..84..225G. doi:10.1007/BF01388809. ISSN 0020-9910.
- Gross, B.; Kohnen, W.; Zagier, D. (1987). "Heegner points and derivatives of L-series. II". Mathematische Annalen. 278 (1–4): 497–562. doi:10.1007/BF01458081. ISSN 0025-5831.
- Gross, Benedict H. (1987). "Heights and the special values of L-series". In Kisilevsky, H.; Labute, J. (eds.). Number Theory: Proceedings of the 1985 Montreal Conference Held June 17–29, 1985. Providence, R.I: Published by the American Mathematical Society for the Canadian Mathematical Society. pp. 115–187. ISBN 978-0-8218-6012-0.
- Gross, Benedict H. (October 1, 1990). "A tameness criterion for Galois representations associated to modular forms (mod p)". Duke Mathematical Journal. 61 (2): 445–517. doi:10.1215/S0012-7094-90-06119-8. ISSN 0012-7094.
- Gross, Benedict H.; Prasad, Dipendra (October 1, 1992). "On the Decomposition of a Representation of SO n When Restricted to SO n-1". Canadian Journal of Mathematics. 44 (5): 974–1002. doi:10.4153/CJM-1992-060-8. ISSN 0008-414X.
- Gan, Wee Teck; Gross, Benedict H.; Prasad, Dipendra (2012). "Symplectic local root numbers, central critical L-values, and restriction problems in the representation theory of classical groups". Sur les conjectures de Gross et Prasad. Paris: Societé mathématique de France. pp. 1–109. ISBN 978-2-85629-348-5. OCLC 827954844.

== See also ==
- Fat Chance: Probability from 0 to 1
- Gross–Koblitz formula
