= David Ginzburg =

Israeli mathematician

- דוד גינזבורג
- Education: Tel Aviv University
- Scientific career
- Fields: Mathematics
- Workplaces: Tel Aviv University
- Thesis: L-Functions for SO(n) × GL(k) (1988)
- Doctoral advisor: Stephen Gelbart

David Ginzburg (Hebrew: דוד גינזבורג) is a professor of mathematics at Tel Aviv University working in number theory and automorphic forms.

== Career ==
Ginzburg received his PhD in mathematics from Tel Aviv University in 1988 under the supervision of Stephen Gelbart. He is a professor of mathematics at Tel Aviv University.

== Research ==
Together with Stephen Rallis and David Soudry, Ginzburg wrote a series of papers about automorphic descent culminating in their book "The descent map from automorphic representations of GL(n) to classical groups". Their automorphic descent method constructs an explicit inverse map to the (standard) Langlands functorial lift and has had major applications to the analysis of functoriality. Also, using the "Rallis tower property" from Rallis's 1984 paper on the Howe duality conjecture, they studied global exceptional correspondences and found new examples of functorial lifts.

== Selected publications ==
- Bump, Daniel; Ginzburg, David (1992). "Symmetric Square L-Functions on GL(r)". Annals of Mathematics. 136 (1): 137–205. doi:10.2307/2946548. JSTOR 2946548. MR 1173928.
- Ginzburg, David; Rallis, Stephen; Soudry, David (1997). "A tower of theta correspondences for $G_2$". Duke Mathematical Journal. 88 (3): 537–624. doi:10.1215/S0012-7094-97-08821-9. MR 1455531.
- Ginzburg, David; Rallis, Stephen; Soudry, David (1999). "On Explicit Lifts of Cusp Forms from GL m to Classical Groups". Annals of Mathematics. 150 (3): 807. arXiv:math/9911264. Bibcode:1999math.....11264G. doi:10.2307/121057. JSTOR 121057. MR 1740991. S2CID 14223575.
- David Ginzburg; Stephen Rallis; David Soudry (2011). The Descent Map from Automorphic Representations of GL(n) to Classical Groups. World Scientific. ISBN 978-981-4304-98-6.
