= Theta correspondence =

In mathematics, the theta correspondence or Howe correspondence is a mathematical relation between representations of two groups of a reductive dual pair. The local theta correspondence relates irreducible admissible representations over a local field, while the global theta correspondence relates irreducible automorphic representations over a global field.

The theta correspondence was introduced by Roger Howe in Howe (1979). Its name arose due to its origin in André Weil's representation theoretical formulation of the theory of theta series in Weil (1964). The Shimura correspondence as constructed by Jean-Loup Waldspurger in Waldspurger (1980) and Waldspurger (1991) may be viewed as an instance of the theta correspondence.

== Statement ==
=== Setup ===
Let $F$ be a local or a global field, not of characteristic $2$. Let $W$ be a symplectic vector space over $F$, and $Sp(W)$ the symplectic group.

Fix a reductive dual pair $(G,H)$ in $Sp(W)$. There is a classification of reductive dual pairs.

=== Local theta correspondence ===
$F$ is now a local field. Fix a non-trivial additive character $\psi$ of $F$. There exists a Weil representation of the metaplectic group $Mp(W)$ associated to $\psi$, which we write as $\omega_{\psi}$.

Given the reductive dual pair $(G,H)$ in $Sp(W)$, one obtains a pair of commuting subgroups $(\widetilde{G}, \widetilde{H})$ in $Mp(W)$ by pulling back the projection map from $Mp(W)$ to $Sp(W)$.

The local theta correspondence is a 1-1 correspondence between certain irreducible admissible representations of $\widetilde{G}$ and certain irreducible admissible representations of $\widetilde{H}$, obtained by restricting the Weil representation $\omega_{\psi}$ of $Mp(W)$ to the subgroup $\widetilde{G}\cdot\widetilde{H}$. The correspondence was defined by Roger Howe in Howe (1979). The assertion that this is a 1-1 correspondence is called the Howe duality conjecture.

Key properties of local theta correspondence include its compatibility with Bernstein-Zelevinsky induction and conservation relations concerning the first occurrence indices along Witt towers .

=== Global theta correspondence ===
Stephen Rallis showed a version of the global Howe duality conjecture for cuspidal automorphic representations over a global field, assuming the validity of the Howe duality conjecture for all local places.

== Howe duality conjecture ==
Define $\mathcal{R}(\widetilde{G},\omega_{\psi})$ the set of irreducible admissible representations of $\widetilde{G}$, which can be realized as quotients of $\omega_{\psi}$. Define $\mathcal{R}(\widetilde{H},\omega_{\psi})$ and $\mathcal{R}(\widetilde{G}\cdot\widetilde{H},\omega_{\psi})$, likewise.

The Howe duality conjecture asserts that $\mathcal{R}(\widetilde{G}\cdot\widetilde{H},\omega_{\psi})$ is the graph of a bijection between $\mathcal{R}(\widetilde{G},\omega_{\psi})$ and $\mathcal{R}(\widetilde{H},\omega_{\psi})$.

The Howe duality conjecture for archimedean local fields was proved by Roger Howe. For $p$-adic local fields with $p$ odd it was proved by Jean-Loup Waldspurger. Alberto Mínguez later gave a proof for dual pairs of general linear groups, that works for arbitrary residue characteristic. For orthogonal-symplectic or unitary dual pairs, it was proved by Wee Teck Gan and Shuichiro Takeda. The final case of quaternionic dual pairs was completed by Wee Teck Gan and Binyong Sun.

== See also ==
- Reductive dual pair
- Metaplectic group

== Bibliography ==
- Gan, Wee Teck; Takeda, Shuichiro (2016), "A proof of the Howe duality conjecture", J. Amer. Math. Soc., 29 (2): 473–493, arXiv:1407.1995, doi:10.1090/jams/839, S2CID 942882
- Gan, Wee Teck; Sun, Binyong (2017), "The Howe duality conjecture: quaternionic case", in Cogdell, J.; Kim, J.-L.; Zhu, C.-B. (eds.), Representation Theory, Number Theory, and Invariant Theory, Progr. Math., 323, Birkhäuser/Springer, pp. 175–192
- Howe, Roger E. (1979), "θ-series and invariant theory", in Borel, A.; Casselman, W. (eds.), Automorphic forms, representations and L-functions (Proc. Sympos. Pure Math., Oregon State Univ., Corvallis, Ore., 1977), Part 1, Proc. Sympos. Pure Math., XXXIII, Providence, R.I.: American Mathematical Society, pp. 275–285, ISBN 978-0-8218-1435-2, MR 0546602
- Howe, Roger E. (1989), "Transcending classical invariant theory", J. Amer. Math. Soc., 2 (3): 535–552, doi:10.2307/1990942, JSTOR 1990942
- Kudla, Stephen S. (1986), "On the local theta-correspondence", Invent. Math., 83 (2): 229–255, Bibcode:1986InMat..83..229K, doi:10.1007/BF01388961, S2CID 122106772
- Mínguez, Alberto (2008), "Correspondance de Howe explicite: paires duales de type II", Ann. Sci. Éc. Norm. Supér., 4, 41 (5): 717–741, doi:10.24033/asens.2080, hdl:11441/70304
- Mœglin, Colette; Vignéras, Marie-France; Waldspurger, Jean-Loup (1987), Correspondances de Howe sur un corps p-adique, Lecture Notes in Mathematics, vol. 1291, Berlin, New York: Springer-Verlag, doi:10.1007/BFb0082712, ISBN 978-3-540-18699-1, MR 1041060
- Rallis, Stephen (1984), "On the Howe duality conjecture", Compositio Math., 51 (3): 333–399
- Sun, Binyong; Zhu, Chen-Bo (2015), "Conservation relations for local theta correspondence", J. Amer. Math. Soc., 28 (4): 939–983, arXiv:1204.2969, doi:10.1090/S0894-0347-2014-00817-1, S2CID 5936119
- Waldspurger, Jean-Loup (1980), "Correspondance de Shimura", J. Math. Pures Appl., 59 (9): 1–132
- Waldspurger, Jean-Loup (1990), "Démonstration d'une conjecture de dualité de Howe dans le cas p-adique, p ≠ 2", Festschrift in Honor of I. I. Piatetski-Shapiro on the Occasion of His Sixtieth Birthday, Part I, Israel Math. Conf. Proc., 2: 267–324
- Waldspurger, Jean-Loup (1991), "Correspondances de Shimura et quaternions", Forum Math., 3 (3): 219–307, doi:10.1515/form.1991.3.219, S2CID 123512840
- Weil, André (1964), "Sur certains groupes d'opérateurs unitaires", Acta Math., 111: 143–211, doi:10.1007/BF02391012
