= Rhonda Hatcher =

American mathematician

Rhonda Lee Hatcher is an American mathematician whose research topics include analytic number theory and L-functions as well as topics in recreational mathematics. She is an emeritus associate professor of mathematics at Texas Christian University.

== Education and career ==
Hatcher graduated summa cum laude from the University of Colorado Boulder in 1980. She earned her Ph.D. in 1988 from Harvard University. Her dissertation, Heights and L-Series, was supervised by Benedict Gross. After completing her doctorate, she taught at St. Olaf College in Minnesota for three years before moving to Texas Christian.

At Texas Christian, Hatcher served as the Faculty Athletics Representative from 1999 until 2023. She has also represented the Big 12 Conference in the National Collegiate Athletic Association Committee on Academics. Within the committee, she took a minority position against a proposed rule change to allow students with high grade point averages to transfer to other schools and maintain their athletic eligibility, arguing that the rule would disproportionately penalize African-American students.

== Book ==
With George T. Gilbert, she is the author of Mathematics Beyond the Numbers (Wiley, 2000; 2nd ed., Kendall Hunt, 2012). This is a mathematics textbook designed for use in liberal arts education. It covers topics mathematics through their applications, including voting systems, apportionment, genetics, opinion polls, scheduling, and cryptography. Its mathematical topics include probability and statistics, graph theory and combinatorial geometry, and number theory.

== Recognition ==
In 1998, Hatcher won the Deborah and Franklin Haimo Award for Distinguished College or University Teaching of Mathematics. The award announcement cited her excellent mathematics teaching at Texas Christian, her work helping high school teachers prepare to teach AP Calculus, and her summer programs which attracted undergraduates from other parts of the country to work with her on number theory, group theory, and graph theory. Some of the research from this program ended up being published in professional journals.
