= Shrawan Kumar (mathematician) =

Indian mathematician

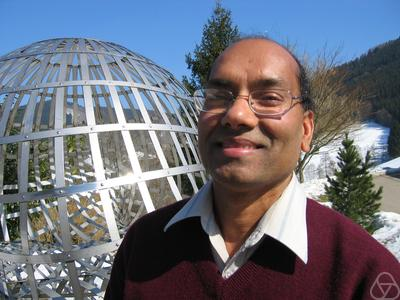
Shrawan Kumar at Oberwolfach in 2005

Shrawan Kumar is the John R. and Louise S. Parker distinguished professor of mathematics at the University of North Carolina at Chapel Hill. He has written two books: Kac-Moody groups, their flag varieties, and representation theory and Frobenius splitting methods in geometry and representation theory (jointly with Michel Brion).

Born and raised in Ghazipur, India, Shrawan Kumar earned a Ph.D. in mathematics from the University of Mumbai and the Tata Institute of Fundamental Research (TIFR), Mumbai in 1986. His advisor was S. Ramanan. Shrawan Kumar is the younger brother of Gopal Prasad, a professor of mathematics at the University of Michigan, and the elder brother of Dipendra Prasad, a professor of mathematics at the Tata Institute of Fundamental Research.

In 2012 he became a fellow of the American Mathematical Society.
