= Symplectic spinor bundle =

In differential geometry, given a metaplectic structure $\pi_{\mathbf P}\colon{\mathbf P}\to M\,$ on a $2n$-dimensional symplectic manifold $(M, \omega),\,$ the symplectic spinor bundle is the Hilbert space bundle $\pi_{\mathbf Q}\colon{\mathbf Q}\to M\,$ associated to the metaplectic structure via the metaplectic representation. The metaplectic representation of the metaplectic group — the two-fold covering of the symplectic group — gives rise to an infinite rank vector bundle; this is the symplectic spinor construction due to Bertram Kostant.

A section of the symplectic spinor bundle ${\mathbf Q}\,$ is called a symplectic spinor field.

== Formal definition ==
Let $({\mathbf P},F_{\mathbf P})$ be a metaplectic structure on a symplectic manifold $(M, \omega),\,$ that is, an equivariant lift of the symplectic frame bundle $\pi_{\mathbf R}\colon{\mathbf R}\to M\,$ with respect to the double covering $\rho\colon {\mathrm {Mp}}(n,{\mathbb R})\to {\mathrm {Sp}}(n,{\mathbb R}).\,$

The symplectic spinor bundle ${\mathbf Q}\,$ is defined to be the Hilbert space bundle

$${\mathbf Q}={\mathbf P}\times_{\mathfrak m}L^2({\mathbb R}^n)\,$$

associated to the metaplectic structure ${\mathbf P}$ via the metaplectic representation ${\mathfrak m}\colon {\mathrm {Mp}}(n,{\mathbb R})\to {\mathrm U}(L^2({\mathbb R}^n)),\,$ also called the Segal–Shale–Weil representation of ${\mathrm {Mp}}(n,{\mathbb R}).\,$ Here, the notation ${\mathrm U}({\mathbf W})\,$ denotes the group of unitary operators acting on a Hilbert space ${\mathbf W}.\,$

The Segal–Shale–Weil representation is an infinite dimensional unitary representation of the metaplectic group ${\mathrm {Mp}}(n,{\mathbb R})$ on the space of all complex valued square Lebesgue integrable square-integrable functions $L^2({\mathbb R}^n).\,$ Because of the infinite dimension, the Segal–Shale–Weil representation is not so easy to handle.
