= Waldspurger's theorem =

Identifies Fourier coefficients of some modular forms with the value of an L-series

In mathematics, Waldspurger's theorem, introduced by Jean-Loup Waldspurger, is a result that identifies Fourier coefficients of modular forms of half-integral weight $k+1/2$ with the value of an L-function at $s=k/2$.
