= Gan Wee Teck =

Malaysian mathematician (born 1972)

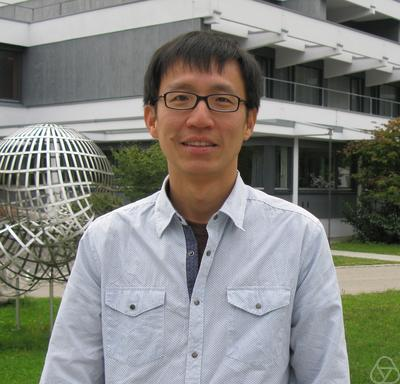
- Gan at Oberwolfach, 2011
- Born: 11 March 1972 (age 54); Malaysia
- Education: Harvard University; Cambridge University
- Known for: Gan–Gross–Prasad conjecture
- Awards: President’s Science Award, Singapore (2017)
- Scientific career
- Fields: Mathematics
- Workplaces: National University of Singapore
- Doctoral advisor: Benedict Gross

Gan Wee Teck (simplified Chinese: 颜维德; traditional Chinese: 顏維德; pinyin: Yán Wéi Dé; Jyutping: Ngaan4 Wai4 Dak1; Pe̍h-ōe-jī: Gân Ûi-tek; born 11 March 1972) is a Malaysian-born Singaporean mathematician. He is a Distinguished Professor of Mathematics at the National University of Singapore (NUS). He is known for his work on automorphic forms and representation theory in the context of the Langlands program, especially the theory of theta correspondence, the Gan–Gross–Prasad conjecture and the Langlands program for Brylinski–Deligne covering groups.

== Biography ==
Though born in Malaysia, Gan grew up in Singapore and attended Pei Hwa Presbyterian Primary School, the Chinese High School, and Hwa Chong Junior College. He did his undergraduate studies at Churchill College, Cambridge, followed by graduate studies at Harvard University, working under Benedict Gross and obtaining his Ph.D. in 1998. He was subsequently a faculty member at Princeton University (1998–2003) and University of California, San Diego (2003–2010) before moving to the National University of Singapore in 2010.

== Contributions ==
With his collaborators, Gan has resolved several basic problems in the theory of theta correspondence (or Howe correspondence), such as the Howe duality conjecture and the Siegel–Weil formula. He has also made contributions to the Gross–Prasad conjecture, the local Langlands correspondence and the representation theory of metaplectic groups.

== Awards and honours ==
- Senior Wrangler, University of Cambridge (1994)
- American Mathematical Society Centennial Fellowship (2002–2003)
- Sloan Research Fellowship (Math, 2003)
- Invited speaker at the International Congress of Mathematicians (ICM) in 2014 (Number Theory section)
- President's Science Award 2017, Singapore
- Fellow of the Singapore National Academy of Science (2018)
- Asian Scientist 100, Asian Scientist, 2018

== Selected works ==
- Gan, Wee Teck; Gross, Benedict H.; Prasad, Dipendra (2012). "Symplectic local root numbers, central critical L-values, and restriction problems in the representation theory of classical groups". Sur les conjectures de Gross et Prasad. Paris: Astérisque (Societé mathématique de France). pp. 1–109. ISBN 978-2-85629-348-5. OCLC 827954844.
- Gan, Wee Teck; Li, Wen-Wei (2018). "The Shimura–Waldspurger Correspondence for Mp(2n)". Simons Symposia. Cham: Springer International Publishing. arXiv:1612.05008. doi:10.1007/978-3-319-94833-1_6. ISBN 978-3-319-94832-4. ISSN 2365-9564. S2CID 119602159.
- Gan, Wee Teck; Takeda, Shuichiro (13 July 2015). "A proof of the Howe duality conjecture". Journal of the American Mathematical Society. 29 (2). American Mathematical Society (AMS): 473–493. arXiv:1407.1995. doi:10.1090/jams/839. ISSN 0894-0347. S2CID 942882.
- Gan, Wee Teck; Ichino, Atsushi (26 March 2013). "Formal degrees and local theta correspondence". Inventiones Mathematicae. 195 (3). Springer Science and Business Media LLC: 509–672. doi:10.1007/s00222-013-0460-5. ISSN 0020-9910. S2CID 253740793.
- Gan, Wee Teck; Savin, Gordan (31 October 2012). "Representations of metaplectic groups I: epsilon dichotomy and local Langlands correspondence". Compositio Mathematica. 148 (6). Wiley: 1655–1694. doi:10.1112/s0010437x12000486. ISSN 0010-437X. S2CID 17621652.
- Gan, Wee Teck; Qiu, Yannan; Takeda, Shuichiro (29 March 2014). "The regularized Siegel–Weil formula (the second term identity) and the Rallis inner product formula". Inventiones Mathematicae. 198 (3). Springer Science and Business Media LLC: 739–831. arXiv:1207.4709. Bibcode:2014InMat.198..739G. doi:10.1007/s00222-014-0509-0. ISSN 0020-9910. S2CID 253737500.
