= Stephen Gelbart =

American-Israeli mathematician

Stephen Samuel Gelbart
- סטיבן סמואל גלברט
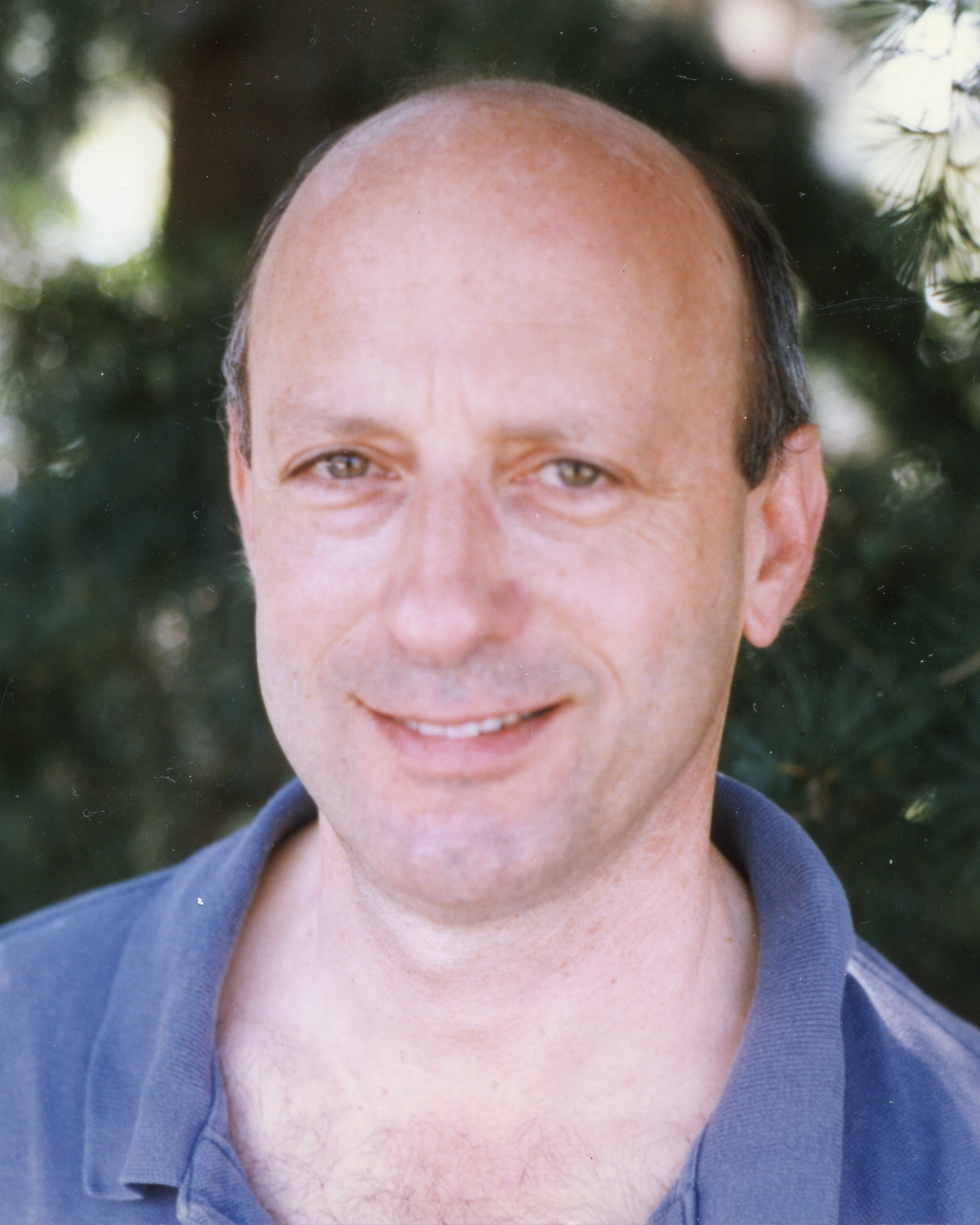
- Born: June 12, 1946 (age 80); Syracuse, New York, USA
- Education: Cornell University, Princeton University
- Known for: Contributions to the Langlands program
- Awards: Fellow of the American Mathematical Society (2013)
- Scientific career
- Fields: Mathematics
- Workplaces: Weizmann Institute of Science
- Doctoral advisor: Elias M. Stein

Stephen Samuel Gelbart (Hebrew: סטיבן סמואל גלברט; born June 12, 1946) is an American-Israeli mathematician who holds the Nicki and J. Ira Harris Professorial Chair in mathematics at the Weizmann Institute of Science in Israel. He was named a fellow of the American Mathematical Society in 2013 "for contributions to the development and dissemination of the Langlands program."

== Biography ==
Gelbart was born in Syracuse, New York, son of the mathematician Abe Gelbart. He graduated from Cornell University in 1967, and earned a Ph.D. from Princeton University in 1970, with a dissertation on Fourier analysis supervised by Elias M. Stein. He returned to Cornell as an assistant professor in 1971, was promoted to full professor in 1980, moved to the Weizmann Institute in 1984, and was given his named chair in 1998. He was president of the Israel Mathematical Union from 1994 to 1996. His doctoral students include Erez Lapid.

== Selected publications ==
=== Articles ===
- Harmonics on Stiefel manifolds and generalized Hankel transforms. Bull. Amer. Math. Soc. 78 (1972) 451–455. MR 0480872
- A theory of Stiefel harmonics. Trans. Amer. Math. Soc. 192 (1974) 29–50. MR 0425519
- An elementary introduction to the Langlands program. Bull. Amer. Math. Soc. 10 (1984) 177–219. MR 0733692
- with Freydoon Shahidi: Boundedness of automorphic L-functions in vertical strips. J. Amer. Math. Soc. 14 (2001) 79–107. MR 1800349
- with Stephen D. Miller: Riemann's zeta function and beyond. Bull. Amer. Math. Soc. 41 (2004) 59–112. MR 2015450

=== Books ===
- Automorphic forms on adele groups. Princeton University Press. 1975. ISBN 0691081565.
- Weil's representation and the spectrum of the metaplectic group. Springer. 1976.
- with Ilya Piatetski-Shapiro and Stephen Rallis: Explicit constructions of automorphic L-functions. 1987.
- with Freydoon Shahidi: Analytic properties of automorphic L-functions. Academic Press. 1988. later edition. Elsevier. 2014. ISBN 9781483261034.
- Lectures on the Arthur-Selberg trace formula. American Mathematical Society. 1996.

=== as editor ===
- with Joseph Bernstein as editor and 6 contributing authors: Bump, D.; Cogdell, J.W.; de Shalit, E.; Gaitsgory, D.; Kowalski, E.; Kudla, S. S. (20 May 2003). Bernstein, J.; Gelbart, S. (eds.). An Introduction to the Langlands Program. Springer Science & Business Media. ISBN 978-0-8176-3211-3.
