= Erez Lapid =

Israeli mathematician

Erez M. Lapid
- ארז לפיד
- Born: May 1971 (age 54); Tel Aviv
- Occupation: Mathematician

Erez M. Lapid (Hebrew: ארז לפיד; born May 1971 in Tel Aviv) is an Israeli mathematician, specializing in automorphic forms, L-functions, representation theory, and the Selberg–Arthur trace formula.

In 1989 Lapid received from Tel Aviv University a B.Sc. and an M.Sc. in mathematics with M.Sc. advisor Aldo Lazar and thesis Compact actions on C^{*}-algebras. In 1989–1994 he performed military service in the Israeli Defense Forces. In 1998 he received a Ph.D. from the Weizmann Institute of Science under Stephen Gelbart with thesis Multiplicities of cuspidal representations of SL(n) and period integrals of truncated Eisenstein series. In the academic year 1998–1999 (and for briefer periods in 2001, 2005, and 2008) he was a visiting scholar at the Institute for Advanced Study. From 1999 to 2002 he was Zassenhaus Assistant Professor at the Ohio State University. In 2002 he was a postdoc at the Courant Institute of Mathematical Sciences. At the Hebrew University of Jerusalem, he became in 2003 a senior lecturer, in 2004 an associate professor, and in 2009-2012 a full professor. Currently, he is a professor at the Weizmann Institute of Science.

In 2005 he won the Krill prize of the Wolf Foundation. In 2010 he was an invited speaker at the International Congress of Mathematicians in Hyderabad.

== Selected publications ==
- with Hervé Jacquet and Jonathan Rogawski: Jacquet, Hervé; Lapid, Erez; Rogawski, Jonathan (1999). "Periods of automorphic forms". J. Amer. Math. Soc. 12: 173–240. doi:10.1090/S0894-0347-99-00279-9. MR 1625060.
- with Stephen Rallis: "On the Nonnegativity of L(1/2,π) for SO(2n+1)". Annals of Mathematics. 157 (3): 891–917. 2003. doi:10.4007/annals.2003.157.891 (inactive 12 July 2025). JSTOR 3597275. MR 1983784. Zbl 1067.11026.
- as editor with David Ginzburg and David Soudry: Automorphic forms and L-functions: Local aspects. American Mathematical Society. 2009. ISBN 9780821847084. MR 2531715.
