= Jean-Loup Waldspurger =

French mathematician

- Born: 2 July 1953 (age 73); France
- Education: École normale supérieure
- Known for: Waldspurger formula Waldspurger's theorem
- Awards: Silver Medal of CNRS; Clay Research Award (2009); ICM Speaker (1983, 1994, 2014); Peccot Lecture (1982/1983)
- Scientific career
- Fields: Mathematics

Jean-Loup Waldspurger (born 2 July 1953) is a French mathematician working on the Langlands program and related areas. He proved Waldspurger's theorem, the Waldspurger formula, and the local Gan–Gross–Prasad conjecture for orthogonal groups. He played a role in the proof of the fundamental lemma, reducing the conjecture to a version for Lie algebras. This formulation was ultimately proven by Ngô Bảo Châu.

== Education ==
Waldspurger attained his doctorate at École normale supérieure in 1980, under supervision of Marie-France Vignéras.

== Scientific work ==
J.-L. Waldspurger's work concerns the theory of automorphic forms. He highlighted the links between Fourier coefficients of modular shapes of half full weight and function values L or periods of modular shapes of full weight. With C. Moeglin, he demonstrated Jacquet's conjecture describing the discrete spectrum of the GL(n) groups. Other works are devoted to orbital integrals on p-adic groups: unipotent orbital integrals, proof of the conjecture of Langlands-Shelstad transfer conditional on the "fundamental lemma" (which was later proved by Ngo-Bao-Chau). J.-L. Waldspurger proved the Gross-Prasad conjecture for SO(N) groups on a p-adic field. With C. Moeglin, he wrote two large volumes establishing the stable trace formula for twisted spaces.

Some recent publications are available on its website.

== Awards ==
He won the Mergier–Bourdeix Prize of the French Academy of Sciences in 1996. He was awarded the 2009 Clay Research Award for his results in p-adic harmonic analysis. He was elected as a member of French Academy of Sciences in 2017.
