= Marie-France Vignéras =

French mathematician

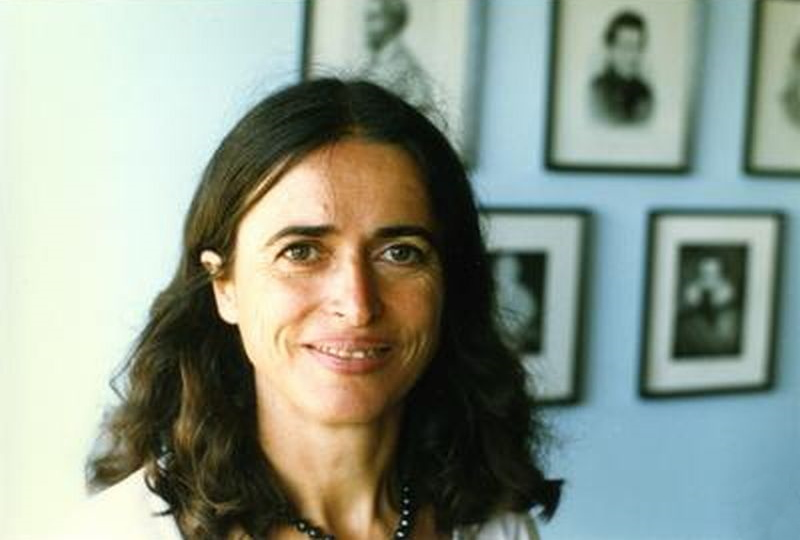
Marie-France Vignéras

Marie-France Vignéras (born 1946) is a French mathematician. She is a Professor Emeritus of the Institut de Mathématiques de Jussieu in Paris. She is known for her proof published in 1980 of the existence of isospectral non-isometric Riemann surfaces. Such surfaces show that one cannot hear the shape of a hyperbolic drum. Another highlight of her work is the establishment of the mod-l local Langlands correspondence for GL(n) in 2000. Her current work concerns the p-adic Langlands program.

== Early life and education ==
Born in 1946, Vignéras was the daughter of Janine Mocudé and Robert Vignéras (sea captain and pilot in the port of Dakar). She spent her childhood in Senegal, and did her high school studies at the lycée Van-Vollenhoven in Dakar. She moved to the University of Bordeaux after receiving her baccalauréat in Senegal. She received the agrégation de mathématiques in 1969 and the doctorat d'Etat in 1974; her thesis was written under the direction of Jacques Martinet.

== Career ==
Vignéras served as Director of Mathematics at the Ecole Normale Supérieure de Sèvres from 1977 to 1983. At the conclusion of her term at the ENS, she rejoined her colleagues at the University of Paris 7.

Since 2010 she has been Emeritus Professor. Vignéras has made numerous invited visits to foreign universities and institutes, including the Max Planck Institute for Mathematics in Bonn, the University of California at Berkeley, the Tata Institute for Fundamental Research in Mumbai, the Radcliffe Institute at Harvard University. She has been the Emmy Noether Professor at the University of Göttingen and has been an invited speaker at the European Congress of Mathematics (Barcelona, 2000) and the International Congress of Mathematics (Beijing, 2002).

Her thesis students include Jean-Loup Waldspurger (directeur de recherches at the C.N.R.S.), Jean-Francois Dat (professor at l'Université Pierre et Marie Curie (Paris 6)), Rachel Ollivier (associate professor at the University of British Columbia) and Tony Ly.

== Awards ==
Vignéras received the Médaille Albert Chatelet in 1978, the Médaille d'argent of the C.N.R.S. in 1984, the Prix von Humboldt in 1985 and the Prix Petit d'Ormoy, Carrière, Thébault of the French Academy of Sciences in 1997. She became a member of the Academia Europaea in 2017. She was elected to the 2018 class of Fellows of the American Mathematical Society.

== Selected publications ==
- Vignéras, Marie-France (1980). Arithmetique Des Algebres De Quaternions. Lecture Notes in Mathematics (in French). Springer-Verlag. ISBN 978-0387099835.
- Vignéras, Marie-France (1996). Representations modulaires des groupes reductifs p-adiques. Representations cuspidales de GL(n). Springer Science and Business Media. ISBN 9780817639297.
- Vignéras, Marie-France (1997). "Cohomology of sheaves on the building and R-representations". Inventiones Mathematicae. 127 (2): 349–373. Bibcode:1997InMat.127..349V. CiteSeerX 10.1.1.172.1897. doi:10.1007/s002220050124. S2CID 10394956.
- Vignéras, Marie-France (2004). "Representations modulo p of the p-adic group GL(2, F)". Compositio Mathematica. 140 (2): 333–358. doi:10.1112/s0010437x03000071.
- Vignéras, Marie-France (2005). "Pro-p-Iwahori Hecke ring and supersingular". Mathematische Annalen. 331 (3): 523–556. doi:10.1007/s00208-004-0592-4. S2CID 119823403.
