= Metaplectic group =

Group in mathematical representation theory

In mathematics and mathematical physics, the metaplectic group is the group that describes how the basic symmetries of classical mechanics act in quantum mechanics. More precisely, the symplectic group consists of the linear changes of position and momentum that preserve the form of Hamiltonian mechanics; equivalently, it is the group of canonical transformations that are linear in position and momentum. When one tries to make those same transformations act on wavefunctions, one is naturally led not to the symplectic group itself but to a closely related two-fold cover of it, called the metaplectic group. For a symplectic space of dimension $2n$, it is usually denoted by Mp_{2n}.

The metaplectic group is thus a double cover of the symplectic group Sp_{2n}. It can be defined over either real or p-adic numbers. The construction covers more generally the case of an arbitrary local or finite field, and even the ring of adeles. The metaplectic group has a particularly significant infinite-dimensional linear representation, the Weil representation. It was used by André Weil to give a representation-theoretic interpretation of theta functions, and is important in the theory of modular forms of half-integral weight and the theta correspondence.

== Motivation from quantum mechanics ==
One way to understand the metaplectic group is as the group needed to make linear canonical transformations act (linearly) on wave functions.

In classical mechanics, the phase space of a system with one degree of freedom has coordinates $(q,p)$, and the linear transformations preserving the basic structure of Hamiltonian mechanics form the symplectic group. For example, the Hamiltonian of the one-dimensional harmonic oscillator,
$$H(q,p)=\tfrac12(q^2+p^2),$$
generates rotations of phase space:
$$(q,p)\mapsto (q\cos t+p\sin t,\,-q\sin t+p\cos t).$$
After a full turn, at $t=2\pi$, this classical canonical transformation is the identity.

In quantum mechanics, however, the corresponding time evolution acts on wave functions by a unitary operator. For the harmonic oscillator, with Hamiltonian
$$\hat H=\tfrac12(P^2+Q^2),$$
the evolution is
$$U(t)=e^{-it\hat H}.$$
If $\psi_0(x)=\pi^{-1/4}e^{-x^2/2}$ is the ground-state wave function, then
$$U(t)\psi_0=e^{-it/2}\psi_0,$$
because $2i\partial_t\psi - \partial_x^2\psi + x^2\psi =0$ for $\psi = e^{-x^2/2 - it/2}$. In particular,
$$U(2\pi)\psi_0=-\psi_0.$$

Thus a full $2\pi$ rotation of classical phase space, which is trivial as a canonical transformation, acts nontrivially on the wave function: it produces a minus sign. Only after a rotation through $4\pi$ does one recover the identity operator on wave functions. This shows that the natural quantum-mechanical object is not the symplectic group itself, but a double cover of it. That double cover is the metaplectic group.

This phenomenon is closely analogous to the role of the spin group as a double cover of the rotation group: in each case, a symmetry that is classically trivial after one full turn may still act nontrivially on quantum states. The metaplectic group is the version of this idea associated with symplectic geometry and canonical transformations rather than with Euclidean rotations.

== Definition ==
The fundamental group of the symplectic Lie group Sp_{2n}(R) is infinite cyclic, so it has a unique connected double cover, which is denoted Mp_{2n}(R) and called the metaplectic group.

The metaplectic group Mp_{2n}(R) is not a matrix group: it has no faithful finite-dimensional representations. Therefore, the question of its explicit realization is nontrivial. It has faithful irreducible infinite-dimensional representations, such as the Weil representation described below.

It can be proved that if F is any local field other than C, then the symplectic group Sp_{2n}(F) admits a unique perfect central extension with the kernel Z/2Z, the cyclic group of order 2, which is called the metaplectic group over F. It serves as an algebraic replacement of the topological notion of a 2-fold cover used when F = R. The approach through the notion of central extension is useful even in the case of real metaplectic group, because it allows a description of the group operation via a certain cocycle.

== Explicit construction for n = 1 ==
In the case n = 1, the symplectic group coincides with the special linear group SL_{2}(R). This group biholomorphically acts on the complex upper half-plane by fractional-linear transformations, such as the Möbius transformation,

$$g\cdot z = \frac{az+b}{cz+d}$$

where

$$g = \begin{pmatrix}a&b\\c&d\end{pmatrix} \in \operatorname{SL}_2(\mathbf{R})$$

is a real 2-by-2 matrix with the unit determinant and z is in the upper half-plane, and this action can be used to explicitly construct the metaplectic cover of SL_{2}(R).

The elements of the metaplectic group Mp_{2}(R) are the pairs (g, ε), where $g\in \operatorname{SL}_2(\mathbf{R})$ and ε is a holomorphic function on the upper half-plane such that $\epsilon(z)^2 = cz+d = j(g, z)$. The multiplication law is defined by:

$(g_1,\epsilon_1)\cdot (g_2,\epsilon_2) = (g_1 g_2, \epsilon),$ where $\epsilon(z) = \epsilon_1(g_2\cdot z)\epsilon_2(z).$

That this product is well-defined follows from the cocycle relation $j(g_1g_2, z) = j(g_1, g_2 \cdot z) j(g_2, z)$. The map

$$(g,\epsilon)\mapsto g$$

is a surjection from Mp_{2}(R) to SL_{2}(R) which does not admit a continuous section. Hence, we have constructed a non-trivial 2-fold cover of the latter group.

== Construction of the Weil representation ==
The existence of the Weil representation can be proven abstractly, as follows. The Heisenberg group has an irreducible unitary representation on a Hilbert space $\mathcal H$, that is,

$$\rho : \mathbb H(V) \longrightarrow U(\mathcal H)$$

with the center acting as multiplication by a given nonzero constant. The Stone–von Neumann theorem states that this representation is essentially unique: if $\rho'$ is another such representation, there exists an automorphism

$\psi \in U (\mathcal H)$ such that $\rho' = \operatorname{Ad}_\psi (\rho)$.

and the conjugating automorphism is unique up to multiplication by a constant of modulus 1. So any automorphism of the Heisenberg group that induces the identity on the center acts on this representation $\mathcal H$—more precisely, the action is only well-defined up to multiplication by a nonzero constant.

The automorphisms of the Heisenberg group (fixing its center) form the symplectic group, so an action of these automorphisms is equivalent to an action of the symplectic group. But the action above is only defined up to multiplication by a nonzero constant, so an automorphism of the group is mapped to an equivalence class $[\psi]\in \operatorname{PU}(\mathcal H)$ of multiples of $\psi$. This is a projective representation, a homomorphism from the symplectic group to the projective unitary group of $\mathcal H$. The general theory of projective representations gives an action of some central extension of the symplectic group on $\mathcal H$. This central extension can be taken to be a double cover, which is the metaplectic group.

Concretely, in the case of Mp_{2}(R), the Hilbert space $\mathcal H$ is $L^2(\mathbf{R})$. In the Schrödinger model, the Heisenberg group acts by translations and by multiplication by characters. The corresponding Weil representation of the metaplectic group is generated by the Fourier transform, dilation operators, and multiplication by quadratic phase factors.

== Generalizations ==
Weil showed how to extend the theory above by replacing $\mathbb{R}$ by any locally compact abelian group G whose Pontryagin dual (the group of characters) is isomorphic to G. The Hilbert space H is then the space of all L^{2} functions on G. The (analogue of) the Heisenberg group is generated by translations by elements of G, and multiplication by elements of the dual group (considered as functions from G to the unit circle). There is an analogue of the symplectic group acting on the Heisenberg group, and this action lifts to a projective representation on H. The corresponding central extension of the symplectic group is called the metaplectic group.

Some important examples of this construction are given by:

- G is a vector space over the reals of dimension n. This gives a metaplectic group that is a double cover of the symplectic group Sp_{2n}(R).
- More generally G can be a vector space over any local field F of dimension n (excluding the case $F=\mathbf C$). This gives a metaplectic group that is a double cover of the symplectic group Sp_{2n}(F).
- G is a vector space over the adeles of a number field (or global field). This case is used in the representation-theoretic approach to automorphic forms.
- G is a finite abelian group. The corresponding metaplectic group is then also finite. This case occurs in the theory of theta functions attached to lattices, where G is typically the discriminant group of an even lattice, equipped with its natural quadratic form.
- A modern point of view on the existence of the linear (not projective) Weil representation over a finite field, namely, that it admits a canonical Hilbert space realization, was proposed by David Kazhdan. Using the notion of canonical intertwining operators suggested by Joseph Bernstein, such a realization was constructed by Gurevich-Hadani.

== Generators ==
Acting on $L^2(\mathbb R^n)$, standard lifts of the symplectic group generators
$$F = \begin{bmatrix} 0&-I\\I&0\end{bmatrix},\quad T_a = \begin{bmatrix} I&a\\0&I\end{bmatrix} (a=a^T),\quad A_a = \begin{bmatrix} a&0\\0&a^{-T}\end{bmatrix}$$
are, respectively, $\mathcal Ff(x)=\int_{\mathbb R^n}e^{-2\pi i x.y}f(y)\,dy,\quad \mathcal T_af(x) = e^{\pi i x^Tax}f(x),\quad \mathcal A_a f(x) = |a|^{n/2}f(a x).$

== See also ==
- Bogoliubov transformation, the action of symplectic transforms on ladder operators
- Heisenberg group
- Metaplectic structure
- Oscillator representation
- Reductive dual pair
- Spin group, a double cover of the rotation group
- Symplectic group
- Theta function
