= Pāvels (name) =

Pāvels is a Latvian given name.

== People with the given name Pāvels ==
- Pāvels Murāns, Latvian former swimmer
- Pavels Rebenoks, Latvian sworn advocate and politician
- Pāvels Švecovs, Latvian modern pentathlete
- Pāvels Veselovs, Latvian professional basketball player
