= Ready Player Me =

Estonian technology company

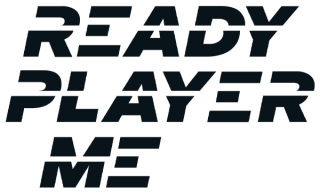
- Formerly: Wolfprint 3D (2014–2018); Wolf3D (2018–2021)
- Type: Subsidiary
- Industry: Video games Computer graphics SaaS
- Founded: 2014 in Tallinn, Estonia
- Founders: Timmu Tõke; Kaspar Tiri; Rainer Selvet; Haver Järveoja
- Defunct: 2025
- Fate: Acquired by Netflix in 2025
- Successor: Netflix
- Headquarters: Tallinn, Estonia
- Area served: Worldwide
- Key people: Timmu Tõke (CEO)
- Parent: Netflix
- Website: readyplayer.me

Ready Player Me (formerly Wolf3D, originally Wolfprint 3D) was an Estonian technology company that provided services to create cross-platform 3D avatars for games. It was based in Tallinn, Estonia before its acquisition by Netflix in 2025.

== History ==
Wolfprint 3D was founded in 2014 by Timmu Tõke, Kaspar Tiri, Rainer Selvet, and Haver Järveoja. Three of the founders, Tõke, Tiri, and Järveoja, graduated from the Estonian Business School, while Selvet studied computer engineering at TalTech. The company initially aimed to create realistic avatars for virtual reality (VR).

In early 2016, Wolfprint 3D introduced the Luna scanner, a 3D scanning booth designed to capture a human’s face in approximately 90 seconds. These scanning booths were installed in public locations such as malls and airports. In December 2016, Wolfprint 3D raised money through a side-by-side equity crowdfunding on SeedInvest to support the deployment of its 3D scanning pods. By December 2016, Wolfprint 3D had built four Luna 3D scanning booths and scanned over 5,000 individuals.

In late 2018, Wolfprint 3D shifted its approach from physical scanners to software-based avatar creation. Under the shortened name Wolf3D, the company began developing technology to generate 3D avatars from a single 2D photograph, resulting in increased scalability and reported revenue growth.

In mid-2020, Wolf3D introduced a new avatar platform, Ready Player Me, enabling developers with plug-and-play tools to integrate its avatar system into a virtual world or game. Early integrations included social VR applications such as VRChat. After shifting focus to AI-generated avatars, Wolf3D secured a $1.3 million seed round in August 2020, led by Trind Ventures, with participation from European seed investors including Presto, Koha, Spring Capital, and Contriber.

Ready Player Me was officially launched in early 2021. As the platform gained popularity, the company rebranded itself to Ready Player Me to align with its primary product. In December 2021, following growth in the Ready Player Me platform, the company announced a Series A funding round of $13 million. The round was led by Taavet+Sten, a venture fund co-founded by Taavet Hinrikus (Wise) and Sten Tamkivi (Teleport), with participation from investors including Tom Preston-Werner (GitHub co-founder), Samsung Next, NordicNinja VC, and Konvoy Ventures.

In August 2022, Ready Player Me completed a Series B funding round totaling $56 million, led by venture capital firm Andreessen Horowitz (a16z), through its gaming-focused funds. Additional investors included David Baszucki (Roblox co-founder), Justin Kan (Twitch co-founder), and venture firms Plural and NordicNinja, among others.

In December 2024, Ready Player Me launched a gaming platform, PlayerZero, where players can create, customize, and carry their avatars across multiple games.

In December 2025, Ready Player Me was acquired by Netflix for an undisclosed amount. They have shut down their services for public use from Jan 31st, 2026.

== Platforms ==
=== Ready Player Me ===
Ready Player Me was a web-based avatar creation platform that provided developer tools and infrastructure to power cross-game avatars.

=== PlayerZero ===
PlayerZero was a gaming platform where players could create, customize, and carry their avatars across multiple games. It allowed direct ownership of digital appearance items via blockchain technology. Upon launch, PlayerZero released "Collection ZERO" wearables, with tens of thousands minted shortly thereafter.
