= List of international prime ministerial trips made by Kaja Kallas =

This is a list of international prime ministerial trips made by Kaja Kallas, who served as the Prime Minister of Estonia from 26 January 2021 to 23 July 2024.

== Summary ==
Kallas has visited 25 countries during her tenure as prime minister. The number of visits per country where Kallas has traveled are:

- One visit to Albania, Austria, Czech Republic, Greece, Luxembourg, Moldova, Norway, Portugal, Singapore, Slovenia, Switzerland and United Arab Emirates
- Two visits to Denmark, Poland, and Ukraine
- Three visits to Spain
- Four visits to Lithuania, Sweden, the United Kingdom and the United States
- Six visits to Finland
- Seven visits to Latvia
- Eight visits to France
- Eleven visits to Germany
- Twenty visits to Belgium

== 2021 ==
Country	Location(s)	Dates	Details
Finland	Helsinki	19 February	Kaja Kallas met with Finnish president Sauli Niinistö and Finnish prime minister Sanna Marin in Helsinki. This was Kallas' first foreign visit as prime minister.
Portugal	Porto	7 May	Kaja Kallas met with Portuguese prime minister António Costa, European Commission president Ursula von der Leyen, Spanish prime minister Pedro Sánchez and Polish prime minister Mateusz Morawiecki in Porto. The European Social Summit took place in Porto.
Ukraine	Kyiv	17–19 May	Kaja Kallas met with Prime Minister Denys Shmyhal, Deputy Prime Minister of Ukraine Oleksii Reznikov, Minister of Foreign Affairs of Ukraine Dmytro Kuleba and President of Ukraine Volodymyr Zelenskyy. They visited the Luhansk region, where they inspected checkpoints, and met with Crimean Tatars in Kiev.
Belgium	Brussels	24–25 May	Kaja Kallas participated in an extraordinary meeting of the European Council in Brussels, where the response to the Belarusian authorities and measures against the coronavirus pandemic, climate change and relations with Russia were discussed. The prime minister also met with NATO Secretary General Jens Stoltenberg.
Belgium	Brussels	14–15 June	Kaja Kallas travelled to Brussels to attend the 31st NATO summit. Met with NATO Secretary General Jens Stoltenberg, US President Joe Biden, Canadian Prime Minister Justin Trudeau, British Prime Minister Boris Johnson, Latvian President Egils Levits and Lithuanian President Gitanas Nausėda. Security issues and the future of NATO were discussed.
Belgium	Brussels	24–25 June	Kaja Kallas participated in the European Council in Brussels, where the resolution of the corona crisis and the first lessons were discussed. Kallas met with United Nations General Assembly UN Secretary-General António Guterres.
Latvia	Valka	28 June	Kaja Kallas went for a walk in the recently completed cross-border city center of Valka with the mayor of Valka Vents Armands Krauklis and the city architect of Valga Jiří Tintěra.
United States	Washington, D.C.	12–13 July	Kaja Kallas participated in Washington with representatives of the US Congress and will speak at the Atlantic Council think tank and the international conference of opinion leaders Yellowstone Weekend.
Germany	Berlin	17 August	Kaja Kallas met with Federal chancellor Angela Merkel in Berlin. The discussion focused on European security and issues related to Belarus, Russia and Afghanistan.
Finland	Helsinki	4 October	Kaja Kallas met with Finnish Prime Minister Sanna Marin in Helsinki and opened the newly renovated embassy building.
Slovenia	Brdo	6 October	Kaja Kallas attended the European Union-Western Balkans summit and met with Slovenian Prime Minister Janez Janša and North Macedonian Prime Minister Zoran Zaev in Brdo.
Sweden	Malmö	13 October	Kaja Kallas met with Prime Minister Stefan Löfven, Latvian president Egils Levits, Lithuanian president Gitanas Nausėda, Romanian president Klaus Iohannis and Ukrainian Prime Minister Denys Shmyhal. Kallas participated in a high-level Holocaust memorial conference.
Latvia	Riga	15 October	Kaja Kallas met with Latvian Prime Minister Arturs Krišjānis Kariņš in Riga and discussed bilateral cooperation, the upcoming meeting of European Union leaders, major cross-border projects and regional security.
Belgium	Brussels	21–22 October	Kaja Kallas participated in the European Council in Brussels, the topics of which were COVID-19, digital issues, migration, energy prices, foreign trade and foreign relations.
United Kingdom	Glasgow	1–2 November	Kallas travelled to Glasgow to attend the 2021 United Nations Climate Change Conference. Met with Prime Minister Boris Johnson, President of the European Commission Ursula von der Leyen, UN Secretary-General António Guterres and President of the United States Joe Biden. Kallas participated in the UN Climate Change Conference (COP26).
France	Paris	24 November	Kaja Kallas met with President Emmanuel Macron at the Élysée Palace in Paris and spoke at the umbrella organization of French businesses MEDEF (Mouvement des Entreprises de France). In addition, Kallas participated in meetings with companies interested in Estonia.
Lithuania	Vilnius	7–8 December	Met with Lithuanian Prime Minister Ingrida Šimonytė and Prime Minister of Latvia Arturs Krišjānis Kariņš at the Baltic Council of Ministers in Vilnius, as well as members of the Estonian-Lithuanian Chamber of Commerce. Kallas visited the Lithuanian-Belarusian Medininkai border crossing point with the ESTPOL5 team.
Belgium	Brussels	15–17 December	met with Prime Minister of Georgia Irakli Garibashvili and Prime Minister of Denmark Mette Frederiksen at the European Council in Brussels. Kallas participated in the Eastern Partnership and Eurozone Summit.

== 2022 ==
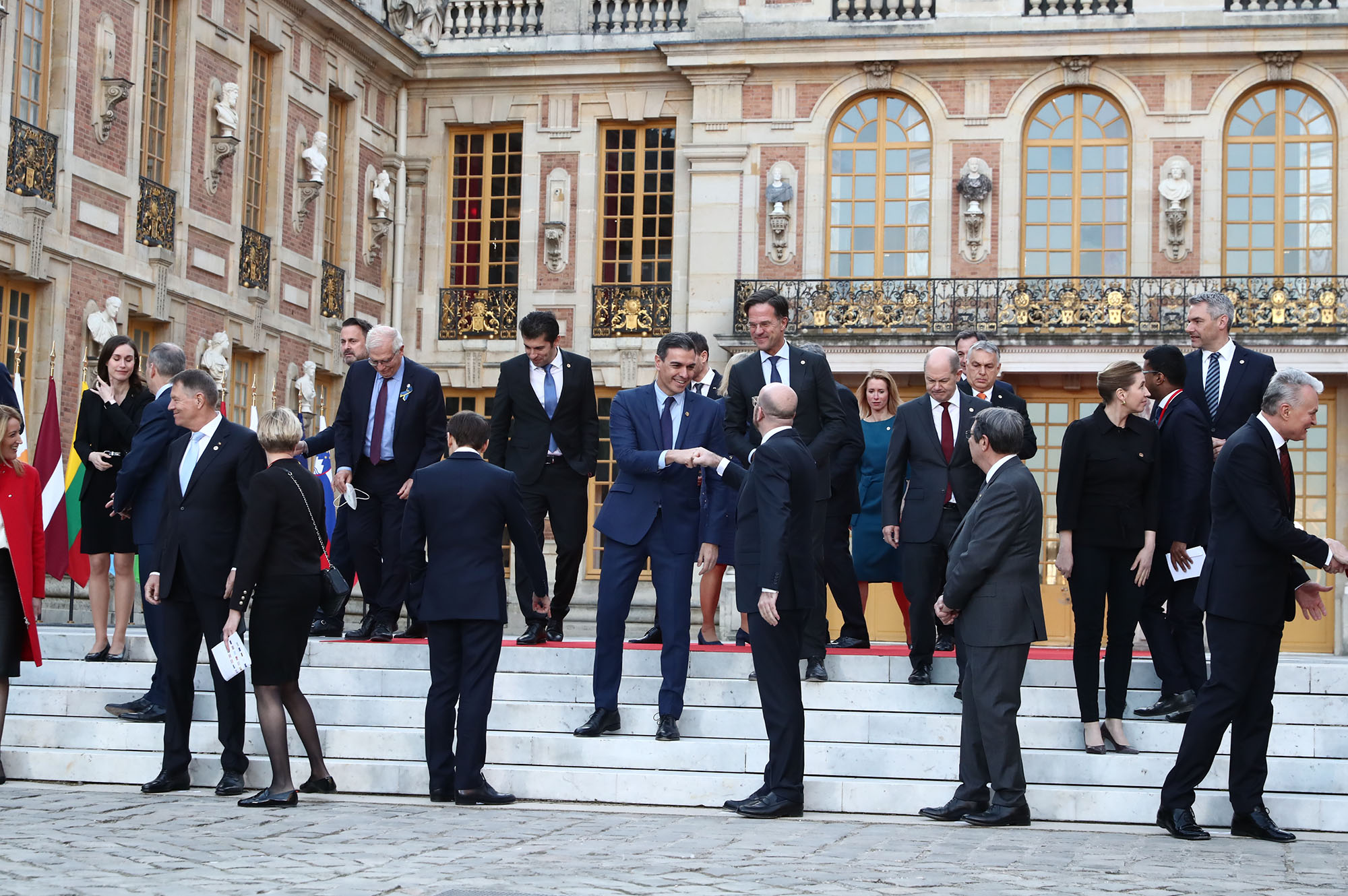
Heads of government preparing to take a group photo at the 2022 Versailles informal summit of EU Heads of State and Government

Country	Location(s)	Dates	Details
Latvia	Riga	4 February	Kaja Kallas met with Prime Minister Arturs Krišjānis Kariņš and Lithuanian prime minister Ingrida Šimonytė at the Baltic Council of Ministers in Riga. International challenges and trilateral cooperation projects were discussed.
Germany	Berlin	10 February	Together with Prime Minister of Latvia Arturs Krišjānis Kariņš and President of Lithuania Gitanas Nausėda met with Federal Chancellor Olaf Scholz in Berlin. The tense security situation in Europe and Ukraine were discussed.
France	Paris	16 February	Kallas met with French President Emmanuel Macron at the Élysée Palace in Paris. At the working dinner, the security situation in the Sahel region was discussed with the leaders of the European and African countries and regional organizations that support the region the most.
Belgium	Brussels	17–18 February	Kaja Kallas met with Prime Minister of Bulgaria Kiril Petkov at the European Council in Brussels, with whom they discussed the security situation in Europe and bilateral cooperation. A summit of the European Union and the African Union also took place, where the strengthening of mutual cooperation, the health crisis caused by COVID-19, climate issues, security and economic cooperation were discussed. On the second day of the visit, Kallas participated in a round table, where the topics were the development of healthcare systems, vaccines and vaccination.
Germany	Munich	18–20 February	Kaja Kallas met with NATO Secretary General Jens Stoltenberg, US Vice President Kamala Harris, British Prime Minister Boris Johnson, Latvian Prime Minister Arturs Krišjānis Kariņš, Lithuanian President Gitanas Nausėda, Belgian Prime Minister Alexander de Croo and Minister of Foreign Affairs José Manuel Albares. Democracy, security, digital and cyber issues were discussed.
Belgium	Brussels	24 February	Kaja Kallas participated in an extraordinary European Council meeting in Brussels, where Russia's large-scale military attack on Ukraine was discussed.
France	Strasbourg, Versailles	9–11 March	Kaja Kallas met with European Parliament President of the European Parliament Roberta Metsola in Strasbourg. Together with other MEPs, they discussed Russia's large-scale aggression against Ukraine, the security situation in Europe and the European Union's support for Ukraine. On the second day of the visit, Kallas participated in an informal meeting of European Union heads of state and government in Versailles, where Russia's military aggression against Ukraine, security issues, increasing defense capabilities and the possibilities of the green and digital revolutions to create a new growth model were discussed.
United Kingdom	London	14–15 March	Kaja Kallas and Estonian Minister of Defence Kalle Laanet met in London with British prime minister Boris Johnson, Latvian prime minister Arturs Krišjānis Kariņš, Lithuanian president Gitanas Nausėda, Finnish president Sauli Niinistö, Swedish prime minister Magdalena Andersson, Icelandic prime minister Katrín Jakobsdóttir and Third Deputy Prime Minister of the Netherlands Carola Schouten. Participated in the meeting of the countries belonging to the Joint Expeditionary Force (Joint Expeditionary Force).
Belgium	Brussels	24–25 March	Kallas travelled to Brussels to attend an extraordinary NATO summit to discuss the Russian invasion of Ukraine. She also attended the European Council.
Norway	Oslo	5–6 April	Official visit. Met with Prime Minister of Norway Jonas Gahr Støre and Speaker of the Norwegian Parliament Masud Gharahkhani in Oslo. They discussed strengthening relations between Estonia and Norway, the changed security situation, and how to support Estonian entrepreneurs in establishing ties and cooperating with Norwegian entrepreneurs.
Latvia	Riga	22 April	Kaja Kallas met with Latvian prime minister Arturs Krišjānis Kariņš and Lithuanian prime minister Ingrida Šimonytė at the Baltic Council of Ministers in Riga. They discussed energy security and support for Ukraine.
Germany	Berlin	25–26 April	Kaja Kallas met with Federal Chancellor of the Federal Republic of Germany Olaf Scholz and Federal Minister of Defense of the Federal Republic of Germany Christine Lambrecht. It was found that urgent changes need to be made to NATO's defense and deterrence posture, including the necessary steps to strengthen NATO's eastern flank.
Finland	Helsinki	6 May	Private Visit. She visited Helsinki, where she had been invited to be one of the keynote speakers at the annual conference of the Finnish Bar Association.
Sweden	Gothenburg, Stockholm	24-25 May	Met with Prince Daniel of Sweden, Duke of Västergötland, at Gothenburg Airport, opened the Estonian-Swedish business seminar "The Future of Mobility and Transport" taking place at the Lindholmen Science Park in Gothenburg, and visited the Estonian House. On the second day of the visit, Kallas met with the prime minister Magdalena Andersson in Stockholm, where they discussed NATO and defense cooperation issues.
Belgium	Brussels	30–31 May	Kaja Kallas met with President of the European Commission Ursula von der Leyen at an extraordinary European Council in Brussels, with whom they discussed Ukraine-related issues, defense and security issues, food security, and the issue of energy and its prices. Ukrainian president Volodymyr Zelenskyy also participated in the meeting via video.
United Kingdom	London	6 June	Met with British prime minister Boris Johnson, British defence minister Ben Wallace and British Foreign Secretary Liz Truss in London, with whom they discussed the NATO Madrid Summit and security issues and opportunities to support Ukraine.
Lithuania	Vilnius	7 June 2022	Met with Lithuanian president Gitanas Nausėda, Latvian prime minister Arturs Krišjānis Kariņš, and Federal Republic of Germany Olaf Scholz in Vilnius, with whom she discussed defense and security issues and preparations for the NATO Madrid Summit, where concrete steps are intended to be taken to strengthen the alliance's eastern flank.
Belgium	Brussels	23–24 June	Attended the European Council meeting. The applications of Ukraine, Moldova and Georgia to join the European Union, support for Ukraine, economic issues and the future of Europe were discussed.
Spain	Madrid	28–30 June	Kallas travelled to Madrid to attend the 32nd NATO summit. Support for Ukraine and Russian invasion and aggression against Ukraine were discussed.
Denmark	Copenhagen and Marienborg	30 August	Kaja Kallas participated in the Baltic Sea Energy Security Summit in Copenhagen and Marienborg at the invitation of Danish prime minister Mette Frederiksen, where she met with President of the European Commission Ursula von der Leyen, Finnish president Sauli Niinistö, Latvian prime minister Arturs Krišjānis Kariņš, Lithuanian president Gitanas Nausėda and Polish president Andrzej Duda. The purpose of the meeting was to discuss the Baltic Sea countries' desire to abandon Russian energy as soon as possible and replace it with renewable energy to achieve the green transition and climate goals.
Germany	Berlin	4 September	Kaja Kallas participated in a festive ceremony with Latvian prime minister Arturs Krišjānis Kariņš and Lithuanian prime minister Ingrida Šimonytė in Berlin, where they were awarded the Friedrich August von Hayek Foundation International Prize for the Protection of Democratic Values and the Implementation of Liberal Economic Policy.
Czech Republic	Prague	6–7 October	Kallas attended at Prague Castle the 1st European Political Community Summit and an informal European Council.
Belgium	Brussels	20-21 October	Participated in the European Council meeting in Brussels, where the discussion mainly focused on issues related to energy and Ukraine.
Finland	Helsinki	15 November	Kaja Kallas, Foreign Minister Urmas Reinsalu, Estonian Minister of Education and Research Tõnis Lukas, Estonian Minister of Economy and Infrastructure Riina Sikkut and Estonian Minister of Entrepreneurship and Information Technology Kristjan Järvan met in Helsinki with Finnish Prime Minister Sanna Marin, Foreign Minister Pekka Haavisto, Minister of Education Li Andersson, Minister of Roads and Communications Timo Harakka and Minister of Regional and Public Administration Sirpa Paatero. The intergovernmental seminar focusing on the future relations between Estonia and Finland discussed, among other things, the relations between Estonia and Finland and the security situation in Europe. The Ministries of Entrepreneurship and Information Technology signed a joint statement on the digitalization of the logistics sector. The Ministries of Economic Affairs and Infrastructure visited the Technical Research Centre of Finland (VTT), where they discussed issues related to nuclear energy. The Ministries of Education and Research participated in the seminar at the University of Helsinki.
Finland	Haltia Nature Centre	24 November	Kaja Kallas visited the Haltia Nature Centre at the invitation of Finnish prime minister Sanna Marin, where she met with President of the European Commission Ursula von der Leyen and Swedish deputy prime minister Ebba Busch.
Albania	Tirana	6 December	Attended EU-Western Balkans summit
Latvia	Riga	9 December	Kaja Kallas met with Latvian prime minister Arturs Krišjānis Kariņš and Lithuanian prime minister Ingrida Šimonytė in Riga. They discussed support for Ukraine, including the next package of European Union sanctions, and the need to hold Russia war criminals accountable.
Germany	Berlin	9 December 2022	Kaja Kallas met with Federal Chancellor of the Federal Republic of Germany Olaf Scholz in Berlin. They discussed support for Ukraine and raising the price for Russia's aggression.
Belgium	Brussels	14–16 December	Kaja Kallas attended the European Council meeting. The focus was on supporting Ukraine, enhancing security, and economic and energy issues. Kallas also participated in the Association of Southeast Asian Nations (ASEAN) summit.
Latvia	Riga	19 December	Kallas attended a Joint Expeditionary Force leaders summit.

== 2023 ==
Country	Location(s)	Dates	Details
Belgium	Brussels	9–10 February	Attended an informal extraordinary European Council meeting. On the agenda were support for Ukraine, economic competitiveness, and migration.
Germany	Munich	17–19 February	Kaja Kallas attended the 59th Munich Security Conference. Met with NATO Secretary General Jens Stoltenberg, French president Emmanuel Macron, Lithuanian president Gitanas Nausėda, Latvian president Egils Levits, Moldovan president Maia Sandu, Montenegrin president Milo Đukanović, North Macedonian prime minister Dimitar Kovačevski, Bulgarian president Rumen Radev, United States vice president Kamala Harris, Finnish prime minister Sanna Marin, Swedish prime minister Ulf Kristersson, Latvian prime minister Arturs Krišjānis Kariņš, Latvian Foreign Minister Edgars Rinkēvičs, EU Foreign Policy Director Josep Borrell and former US Central Intelligence Agency Director David Petraeus. The opening discussion "Against Lawlessness: Ensuring Accountability" discussed how to ensure that Russia is held accountable for the crimes committed in Ukraine. The future of European security architecture was discussed in the discussion "Back to the Future? Visions for the European Security Architecture". Kallas participated in the celebration of the anniversary of the Republic of Estonia with the local Estonian community at the Munich Estonian Society.
Belgium	Brussels	22–24 March	Attended the European Council. The topic was the focus of European Union countries on assisting Ukraine and increasing economic competitiveness. Kallas also participated in the Eurozone summit, where the current economic situation and budgetary and economic policies were discussed.
Ukraine	Kyiv, Bucha, Borodianka, Zhytomyr	24 April	Met with Ukrainian president Volodymyr Zelenskyy, Prime Minister Denys Shmyhal, Minister of Defense Oleksii Reznikov, and Minister of Internal Affairs Ihor Klymenko. Kallas attended a press conference and spoke with students of the State Polytechnic University. Zelensky awarded Kallas with the Order of Prince Yaroslav the Wise. After the meeting, Kallas headed to Kyiv, Bucha, and Borodianka to see the war damage around Bucha
Poland	Warsaw	25 April	Met with Polish prime minister Mateusz Morawiecki in Warsaw. They discussed preparations for the NATO Vilnius Summit and stopping Russian aggression and supporting Ukraine. They also discussed issues of bilateral cooperation, including defense cooperation.
Denmark	Copenhagen	15 May	Participated in the Copenhagen Democracy Summit in Copenhagen at the invitation of Danish prime minister Mette Frederiksen. The discussion focused on Russian aggression against Ukraine and support for Ukraine. Kallas met with the conference's main organizer and former Danish prime minister Anders Fogh Rasmussen and Czech President Petr Pavel. In addition, Kallas visited the Innovation Center of the Technical University of Denmark with a business delegation.
Moldova	Chișinău, Bulboaca	1 June	Kallas attended the second summit of the European Political Community.
Singapore	Singapore	4–6 June	Met with President Halimah Yacob, Prime Minister Lee Hsien Loong, Minister of Defence Ng Eng Hen and German minister of defence Boris Pistorius. Kallas participated in the region's largest security conference Shangri-La Dialogue. Kallas and Deputy Prime Minister Lawrence Wong opened the Estonian embassy building and the entrepreneurship centre in Singapore. Kallas participated in the Estonia-Singapore business seminar, where she met with Singaporean Minister of Information Technology Josephine Teo at the AsiaTechX technology conference. This was Kallas' first visit to Asia as Prime Minister of Estonia.
Belgium	Brussels	28–30 June	Kallas attended the European Council. During a meeting at NATO Headquarters with NATO Secretary General Jens Stoltenberg and Belgian prime minister Alexander de Croo, support for Ukraine and broader security were discussed.
Lithuania	Vilnius	10–12 July	Kallas attended the 33rd NATO summit. The strength of NATO's deterrence and collective defense, both now and in the future, and the issues of Ukraine were discussed.
Finland	Helsinki	29 September	Met with President Sauli Niinistö and Prime Minister Petteri Orpo in Helsinki. She participated in a meeting with representatives of major Finnish investors and companies at the Estonian Embassy and spoke at a discussion at the Helsinki Security Forum together with Foreign Minister Elina Valtonen.
Spain	Granada	5–6 October	Kallas attended the third summit of the European Political Community.
Greece	Athens	9–10 October	Met with President Katerina Sakellaropoulou and Prime Minister Kyriakos Mitsotakis in Athens. The meeting discussed strengthening cooperation between Estonia and Greece and security issues, including cooperation in NATO. At the Athens Academy, the Society for Hellenism and Philhellenism presented Kallas with the Lord Byron International Prize, which recognized her for standing up for freedom and democratic values.
Sweden	Visby	12–13 October	Kallas attended a Joint Expeditionary Force summit.
France	Paris	18 October	Kallas met with French president Emmanuel Macron at the Élysée Palace in Paris. Support for Ukraine and issues related to Russia were discussed. Kallas also participated in a business seminar held at the Paris Embassy, which focused on energy and green technologies. The prime minister delivered the closing speech at a conference dedicated to the 70th anniversary of the well-known French news magazine L’Express.
Belgium	Brussels	26–27 October	Attended the European Council. The meeting focused on additional protection of critical undersea infrastructure. Kallas participated in the Global Gateway Forum, which aims to promote high-quality and sustainable infrastructure projects around the world to bridge the digital divide, especially in less developed regions.
France	Paris	10 November	Kaja Kallas met with President Emmanuel Macron and President of Montenegro Jakov Milatović in Paris. A roundtable discussion on internet security took place.
United States	Washington, D.C.	13–14 November	Kaja Kallas met with representatives of the United States administration and Congress in Washington. Kallas opened the renovated building of the Estonian embassy and participated in the 40th anniversary event of the National Endowment for Democracy. The International Republican Institute awarded Kallas the Jeane J. Kirkpatrick Award, which recognized Kallas and Estonia for promoting open governance and democratic values and taking an advocacy role in resolving geopolitical challenges.
France	Paris	28–29 November	Kaja Kallas met with President of France Emmanuel Macron, President of the European Council Charles Michel, acting prime minister of the Netherlands Mark Rutte, Prime Minister of Luxembourg Luc Frieden, Prime Minister of Portugal António Costa at the Élysée Palace in Paris. The future of the European Union and its enlargement and its strategic agenda were discussed.
United Arab Emirates	Dubai	30 November – 2 December	Kallas travelled to Dubai to attend the 2023 United Nations Climate Change Conference.
Germany	Hamburg	3–5 December	Kaja Kallas participated in the security conference "Munich Strategy Retreat" in Elmau, Hamburg, where she received the Marion Dönhoff Award. In addition, Kallas met with representatives of the Estonian community.
Belgium	Brussels	13–16 December	Attended the European Council meeting. The issues of the enlargement of the European Union and the Western Balkans, as well as continued support for Ukraine, were discussed.

== 2024 ==
Country	Location(s)	Dates	Details
Belgium	Brussels	31 January – 1 February	Attended an extraordinary European Council. The aim of the discussion was to create a €50 billion facility for the next four years to help Ukraine with grants and loans. Kallas attended the Jean Delors memorial ceremony and met with Polish prime minister Donald Tusk and Dutch acting prime minister Mark Rutte.
Austria	Vienna	8 February	Met with Federal chancellor Karl Nehammer in Vienna and discussed European Union issues, including the enlargement of the Union, migration issues and the Schengen area. Kallas attended the traditional Vienna Opera Ball as a guest of the Austrian chancellor, to which President Alexander Van der Bellen, Federal chancellor Karl Nehammer and Austrian foreign minister Alexander Schallenberg were also invited.
Germany	Munich	16–20 February	Kaja Kallas participated in the 60th Munich Security Conference. She met with NATO Secretary General Jens Stoltenberg, Czech President Petr Pavel, Belgian prime minister Alexander de Croo, Danish prime minister Mette Frederiksen, Iraqi prime minister Mohammed Shia' al-Sudani, Qatari Prime Minister Mohammed bin Abdulrahman bin Jassim Al Thani, German Interior Minister Nancy Faeser, and \U. S. Secretary of State Antony Blinken. Kallas also met with young female politicians and gave a speech at a dinner organized by FRAUEN 100 and the Centre for Feminist Foreign Policy (CFFP) dedicated to women's rights. Kallas participated in the main stage discussion "In It to Win It: The Future of Ukraine and Transatlantic Security" with NATO Secretary General Jens Stoltenberg. ("We are here to win it: The future of Ukraine and transatlantic security"). The discussion was introduced by a speech by Ukrainian president Volodymyr Zelenskyy. Kallas also spoke at the Ukraine-themed luncheon "2024 - It's In Our Hands", where she participated with Hillary Clinton, Belgian prime minister Alexander De Croo, Czech President Petr Pavel, and Danish prime minister Mette Frederiksen.
France	Paris	26 February	Met with French president Emmanuel Macron at the Élysée Palace in Paris, where she spoke with the heads of government and state about continued support for Ukraine.
United States	Washington, D. C.	14–16 March	Met with US president Joe Biden and attended the Gridiron Club annual dinner.
Germany	Berlin	19-20 March	Participated in Berlin with President of Germany Frank-Walter Steinmeier, Chancellor of the Federal Republic of Germany Olaf Scholz and Minister of Foreign Affairs of Germany Annalena Baerbock at an event where she received the Walther Rathenau award named after the former German foreign minister of Germany, and spoke at a conference organized by the Friedrich August von Hayek Foundation dedicated to the 80th anniversary of the publication of the influential economist Hayek's popular work "The Road to Serfdom". Kaja Kallas opened a business seminar at the Estonian Embassy in Berlin.
Belgium	Brussels	21–22 March	Kallas attended the Nuclear Energy Summit and the European Council summit. The discussion focused on assisting Ukraine and strengthening the European defense industry.
Poland	Warsaw	11 April	Kaja Kallas met with Polish prime minister Donald Tusk, President of the European Council Charles Michel, Greek prime minister Kyriakos Mitsotakis, Finnish prime minister Petteri Orpo, Tánaiste Micheál Martin, Luxembourgish prime minister Luc Frieden and Spanish prime minister Pedro Sánchez in Warsaw, with the aim of preparing a vision of the European Union's priorities for the next five years. The draft Action Plan was to be approved at the European Council in June. Kaja Kallas participated with Donald Tusk in the commemoration of the Katyn Memorial.
Belgium	Brussels	18–19 April	Attended an extraordinary European Council. The discussion included the situation in the Middle East, support for Ukraine, the competitiveness of the European Union's internal market, and relations with Turkey.
France	Paris	3 May	Met with French president Emmanuel Macron and French prime minister Gabriel Attal at the Élysée Palace in Paris, where they discussed issues related to supporting Ukraine and ensuring European security, and talked about preparations for the upcoming NATO Washington Summit. Kaja Kallas participated in an event organized by the Robert Schuman Foundation at Sciences Po University.
Latvia	Riga	6 May	Met with Latvian prime minister Evika Siliņa, Lithuanian prime minister Ingrida Šimonytė, and German chancellor Olaf Scholz in Riga, where they discussed assistance to Ukraine and European security, as well as the future of the European Union and major regional energy and transport projects.
Lithuania	Vilnius	13 May	Met with Lithuanian prime minister Ingrida Šimonytė and Latvian prime minister Evika Siliņa at the Baltic Council of Ministers in Vilnius, where they discussed support for Ukraine and the security of Europe and our region, including joint infrastructure projects, the next strategic plan of the European Union and the future of the EU in general.
Spain	Madrid	30 May – 2 June	Secret visit. Attended the Bilderberg meeting on foreign policy and security.
Sweden	Stockholm	5 June	Met with Prime Minister Ulf Kristersson in Stockholm, where the focus was on strengthening business and economic contacts between Estonia and Sweden. Kaja Kallas and Ulf Kristersson participated in the technology entrepreneur conference Sommarminglet.
Germany	Berlin	11 June	Kaja Kallas met with Lithuanian prime minister Ingrida Šimonytė, Montenegrin prime minister Milojko Spajić, Ukrainian deputy prime minister Olha Stefanishyna, British Foreign Secretary David Cameron, Dutch Acting prime minister Mark Rutte, Romanian foreign minister Luminita Odobescu, German Minister for European Affairs Anna Lührmann and Vice-President of the European Commission Maroš Šefčovič at the Berlin conference on the reconstruction of Ukraine, where they participated in a panel discussion at the conference focusing on preparations for Ukraine's accession to the European Union. Kaja Kallas participated in a conference with Estonian Minister of Health Riina Sikkut, who took part in a discussion on mental health, rehabilitation and e-health. Kaja Kallas spoke at an event organized by the German NATO Association on the occasion of the 75th anniversary of NATO and the 20th anniversary of Estonia's accession to NATO.
Switzerland	Lucerne	15–16 June	Kallas travelled to Nidwalden to attend the Global peace summit.
Belgium	Brussels	17 June	Participation in the informal summit of the European Union following the European elections, where there was a discussion on the filling of top positions and procedures in the European Union institutions.
Luxembourg	Luxembourg City	26 June	Kaja Kallas met with Grand Duke Henri, Prime Minister Luc Frieden, and European Court of Justice President Koen Lenaerts, discussing upcoming important meetings in the European Union and NATO, European security and long-term support for Ukraine, and the Middle East.
Belgium	Brussels	27–28 June	Kallas attended the European Council summit.
United States	Washington, D.C.	9–11 July	Kallas attended the 34th NATO summit.
United Kingdom	Woodstock	18 July	Kallas attended the fourth summit of the European Political Community.

== Multilateral meetings ==
Kaja Kallas participated in the following summits during her premiership:

Group	Year			
Group	2021	2022	2023	2024
NATO	14 June, (Belgium) Brussels	24 March, (Belgium) Brussels	11–12 July, (Lithuania) Vilnius	9–11 July, (United States) Washington, D.C.
NATO	14 June, (Belgium) Brussels	28–30 June, (Spain) Madrid	11–12 July, (Lithuania) Vilnius	9–11 July, (United States) Washington, D.C.
Ukraine Recovery Conference	7 July, (Lithuania) Vilnius	4–5 July, (Switzerland) Lugano	21–22 June^{[a]}, (United Kingdom) London	11–12 June, (Germany) Berlin
UNCCC	1–2 November (United Kingdom) Glasgow	11 November (Egypt) Sharm el-Sheikh	30 November – 3 December (United Arab Emirates) Dubai	
JEF	None	14–15 March, (United Kingdom) London	12–13 October, (Sweden) Visby	
JEF	None	19 December, (Latvia) Riga	12–13 October, (Sweden) Visby	
EPC	Didn't exist	6 October, (Czech Republic) Prague	1 June, (Moldova) Bulboaca	18 July, (United Kingdom) Woodstock
EPC	Didn't exist	6 October, (Czech Republic) Prague	5 October, (Spain) Granada	18 July, (United Kingdom) Woodstock
EU–CELAC	None		17–18 July, (Belgium) Brussels	None
Others	None	None	None	Global Peace Summit; 15–16 June (Switzerland) Lucerne
██ = Did not attend.^aPresident Alar Karis attended in the prime minister's place.
