= Karl Angelo Maiuri =

Estonian entrepreneur

Angelo Maiuri
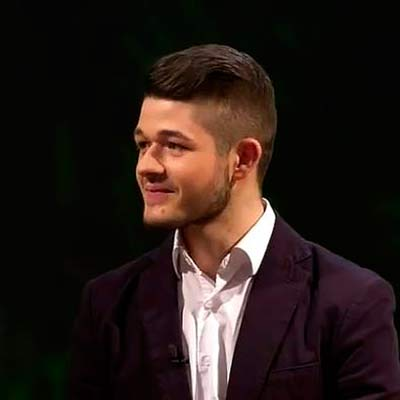

Personal details
- Born: Karl Angelo Maiuri Salerno, Italy
- Occupation: Businessman

Karl Angelo Maiuri is an Estonian businessman. He is the co-founder of the camera accessories firm Tempesta Camera Gear and the food trading platform SIBIS, which was one of the most active organisations fighting for the rights of farmers in Estonia.

== Career ==
Karl Angelo Maiuri was born on 19 September 1998 in Salerno, Italy. He started school in Estonia and graduated Estonian Business School in 2017. He began his career by manufacturing camera accessories for young filmmakers when he was the co-founder of Tempesta Camera Gear.

In 2015 he joined forces with Rudolf-Gustav Hanni to create SIBIS, a food trading platform for local farmers. Since 2015 SIBIS has been fighting actively for the rights of local farmers, to make farming more profitable for farmers and raise the standards of production and product distribution.

In 2017 he became the Estonian Country Manager at AdGoals, an innovative affiliate marketing platform.

He is the Estonian representative of the international Young Entrepreneurs community.

== Awards ==
Karl Angelo Maiuri has been awarded by MAXIMA for his achievements as an "Entrepreneurship talent". His company Tempesta Camera Gear was also claimed the most successful youth start-up of Harju County and the most successful youth ICT and Engineering Start-Up and one of the two nominates for the most successful youth start-up of Estonia by Entrum.
