= Kaja Kallas =

Estonian politician and diplomat (born 1977)

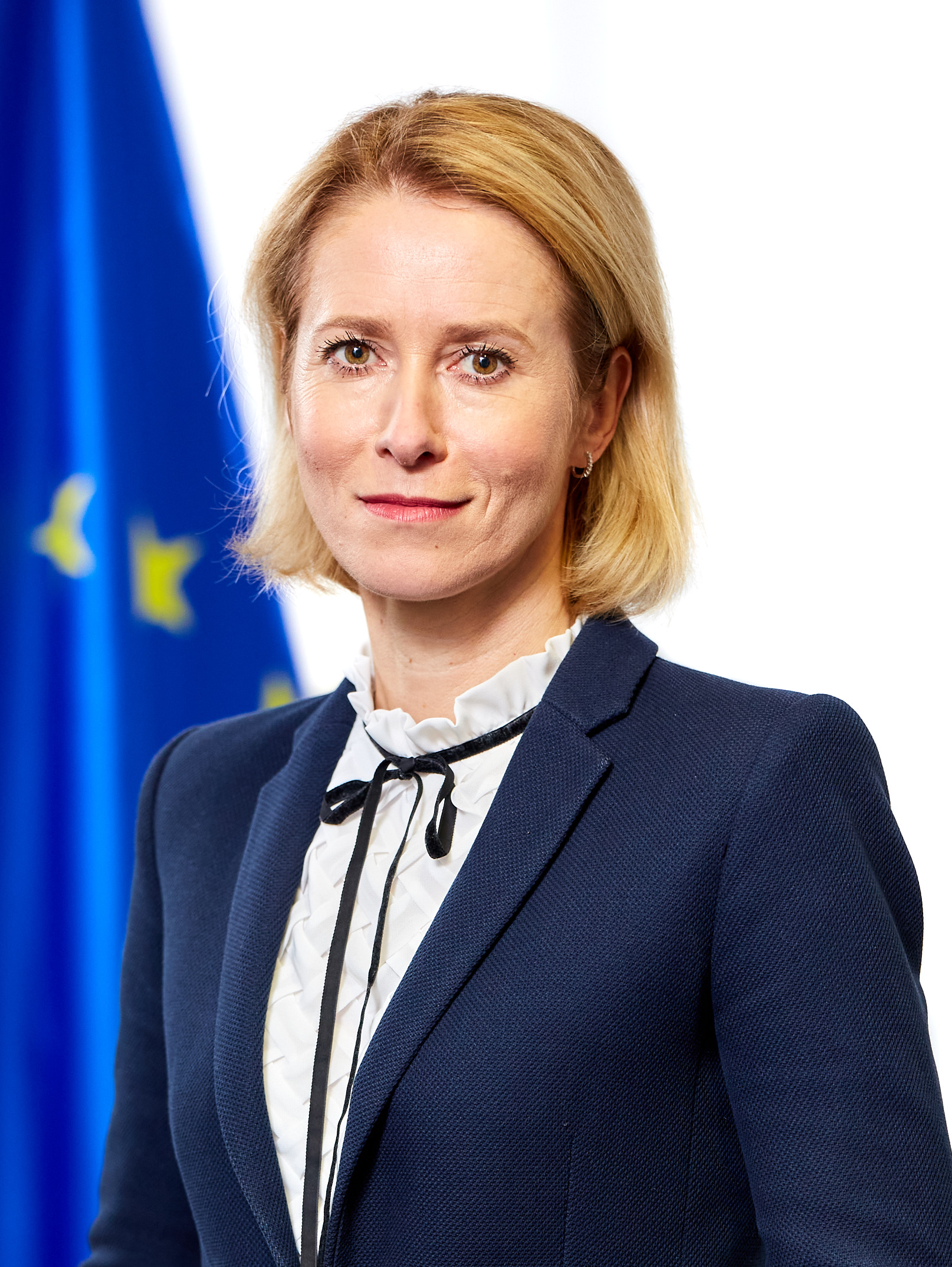
- Official portrait, 2024

Vice-President of the European Commission
- Incumbent
- Assumed office 1 December 2024
- Commission: Von der Leyen II
- Preceded by: Josep Borrell

High Representative of the European Union for Foreign Affairs and Security Policy
- Incumbent
- Assumed office 1 December 2024
- Commission: Von der Leyen II
- Preceded by: Josep Borrell

Prime Minister of Estonia
- In office 26 January 2021 – 23 July 2024
- President: Kersti Kaljulaid; Alar Karis
- Preceded by: Jüri Ratas
- Succeeded by: Kristen Michal

Leader of the Estonian Reform Party
- In office 14 April 2018 – 8 September 2024
- Preceded by: Hanno Pevkur
- Succeeded by: Kristen Michal

Member of the Riigikogu
- In office 3 March 2019 – 26 January 2021
- Constituency: Harju–Rapla
- In office 6 March 2011 – 1 July 2014
- Constituency: Harju–Rapla

Member of the European Parliament for Estonia
- In office 1 July 2014 – 5 September 2018

Personal details
- Born: 18 June 1977 (age 49) Tallinn, then part of the Estonian SSR, Soviet Union (Note: Estonia was occupied and de facto incorporated into the Soviet Union during 1940–1941 and 1944–1991, though this annexation was not legally recognised by most of the international community.)
- Party: Estonian Reform (since 2010)
- Spouses: Roomet Leiger (m. 2002; div. 2006) Arvo Hallik (m. 2018)
- Domestic partner: Taavi Veskimägi (2011–2014)
- Children: 1
- Parent: Siim Kallas (father)
- Relatives: Eduard Alver (great-grandfather)
- Education: University of Tartu (BA); Estonian Business School (EMBA)
- Website: kajakallas.ee

Kaja Kallas (Note: Estonian pronunciation: [ˈkɑjɑ ˈkɑlːɑs]) (born 18 June 1977) is an Estonian politician and diplomat. She was the first female prime minister of Estonia, a role she held from 2021 until 2024, when she resigned in advance of her appointment as High Representative of the European Union for Foreign Affairs and Security Policy. Since 2024, she has served in that role as well as Vice-President of the European Commission in the second von der Leyen Commission.

The daughter of former prime minister Siim Kallas, she was leader of the Estonian Reform Party from 2018 to 2024 and a member of the Riigikogu during 2011–2014 and 2019–2021. Kallas was a member of the European Parliament during 2014–2018, representing the Alliance of Liberals and Democrats for Europe. Before her election to Riigikogu, she was a lawyer specialising in European competition law. Kallas has taken a strong stance against Russia, advocating for robust sanctions and military support for Ukraine following the 2022 Russian invasion of Ukraine.

== Early life and education ==
Kaja Kallas was born on 18 June 1977 in Tallinn. Her father, Siim Kallas, was director of an Estonian branch of the Savings Bank of the USSR in 1986–1989 and later, following the Estonian Restoration of Independence in 1991, served as chairman of the Bank of Estonia in 1991–1995, as prime minister of Estonia in 2002–2003, and as a European Commissioner in 2004–2014. Kallas' paternal great-grandfather, Eduard Alver (1886–1939), a lawyer, was the commander of the Estonian Defence League during the Estonian War of Independence from 1918 to 1920 and also served as the head of the country's police and the Internal Security Service.

During the March 1949 Soviet mass deportations, Kallas' mother, Kristi, six months old at the time, grandmother and great-grandmother, all labeled as "enemies of the state", were deported to Siberia. Her mother was allowed to return to Estonia in 1959. Apart from her Estonian heritage, Kallas patrilineally has some distant Latvian and German ancestry, as discovered by journalists researching her father's family roots after his premiership.

Kallas attended primary and secondary school in Tallinn. She graduated from the University of Tartu in 1999 with a bachelor's degree in law. In 2007, Kallas began studying towards a Master of Business Administration (MBA) at the Estonian Business School (EBS), which she did not complete. She went on to obtain a one-year Executive Master of Business Administration (EMBA) from EBS in 2010.

== Professional career ==
From 1996 to 1997, Kallas worked as advisor to the director of Vanemuine Theatre in Tartu. Kallas became a member of the Estonian Bar Association in 1999, and an attorney-at-law in 2002. While training in European law, she briefly worked as a lawyer at the corporate law firms Courtois Lebel in Paris (March–April 2001) and Hannes Snellmann in Helsinki (October 2003). She became a partner in the law firms Tark & Co and Luiga Mody Hääl Borenius, where she headed the competition law department from 2008 to 2011. Kallas also worked as an executive coach at the Estonian Business School. In 2011, she was placed on inactive status as a member of the Estonian Bar Association.

Between 2003 and 2010, Kallas was a council member of several Estonian private and public limited companies: LHV-Seesam Varahaldus, Pakri Tuulepark, Viru-Nigula Tuulepark, Hiiumaa Offshore Tuulepark, Paldiski Tuulepark, Tooma Tuulepark, Roheline Ring Tuulepargid, Biofond and 4E Tehnoinvest. In 2008, Kallas was a board member of Nelja Energia. From 2009 to 2010, Kallas was a board member of the Estonian Wind Power Association.

== Political career ==
=== Member of the Estonian Parliament (2011–2014) ===
In 2010, Kallas joined the Estonian Reform Party. In the 2011 parliamentary elections she won a seat in the Riigikogu (for the Harju County and Rapla County constituency) receiving 7,157 votes. She was a member of the 12th Parliament of Estonia and chaired the Economic Affairs Committee from 2011 to 2014.

=== Member of the European Parliament (2014–2018) ===
In the 2014 European Parliament election in Estonia, Kallas received 21,498 votes. In the European Parliament, Kallas served on the Committee on Industry, Research and Energy and was a substitute for the Committee on the Internal Market and Consumer Protection. She was a vice-chair of the Delegation to the EU–Ukraine Parliamentary Cooperation Committee as well as a member of the Delegation to the Euronest Parliamentary Assembly and Delegation for relations with the United States. In addition to her committee assignments, Kallas was a member of the European Parliament Intergroup on the Digital Agenda, and was also a vice-chair of the Youth Intergroup.

During her period in Parliament, Kallas worked on the Digital Single Market strategy, energy, and consumer policies, and relations with Ukraine. In particular, she defended the rights of small and medium-sized enterprises, maintaining that borders in the digital world hinder the emergence of innovative companies. She is a proponent of innovation and frequently emphasises that regulations must not hinder the technological revolution.

Kallas served as rapporteur for six reports: opinion on the ePrivacy Regulation, civil law rules on robotics, on the Annual report on EU Competition Policy, and on Delivering a New Deal for Energy Consumers, legislation on Custom infringements and sanctions, and the own-initiative report on the Digital Single Market. During her time in Parliament, she was also nominated as a European Young Leader (EYL40). At the end of her term, she was cited by Politico as one of the 40 most influential MEPs, and one of the most powerful women in Brussels, who was highlighted for her understanding of technological issues.

=== Return to national politics (2017–2020) ===
On 13 December 2017, the Reform Party leader Hanno Pevkur announced that he would no longer run for the party leadership in January 2018, and suggested that Kallas should run instead. After considering the offer, Kallas announced on 15 December 2017 that she would accept the invitation to run in the leadership election. Kallas won the leadership election held on 14 April 2018 and became the first female leader of a major political party in Estonia.

In the 2019 Estonian parliamentary election on 3 March, the Reform Party led by Kallas received about 29% of the vote, with the ruling Estonian Centre Party taking 23%. The Centre Party managed to form Jüri Ratas' second cabinet with the conservative Isamaa party and the far-right EKRE, leaving the Reform Party out of power. On 14 November 2020, Kallas was re-elected as leader of the Reform Party at a Reform Party Assembly.

=== Prime Minister of Estonia (2021–2024) ===
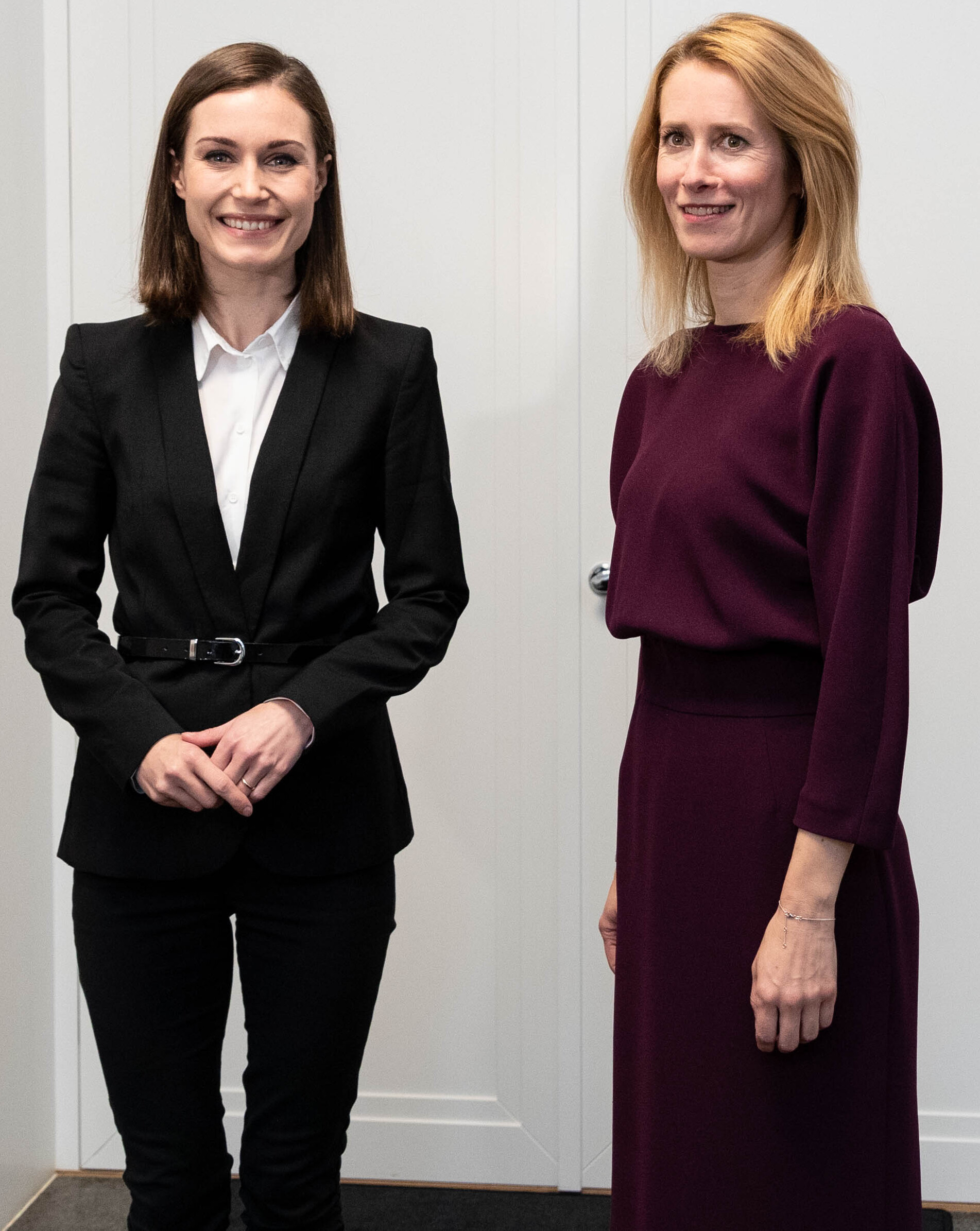
Kaja Kallas and Sanna Marin, then prime minister of Finland, in Helsinki, 2021

On 25 January 2021, after the fall of the Centre Party led cabinet with conservative parties, Kaja Kallas's first cabinet, a coalition with the Centre Party, was formed. In doing so, she became the first female prime minister in Estonia's history.

In June 2021, Kallas confronted German chancellor Angela Merkel at a European Council meeting opposing Merkel's plan to invite Russia's president Vladimir Putin to a summit of European leaders. Her opposition surprised other gathered leaders but successfully contributed to encouraging fellow leaders to force Merkel not to invite Putin. Later in the year Kallas stated that Russian military pressure should not influence the decision of which countries can join the European Union or NATO, and she did not like U.S. President Biden's outreach to Putin.

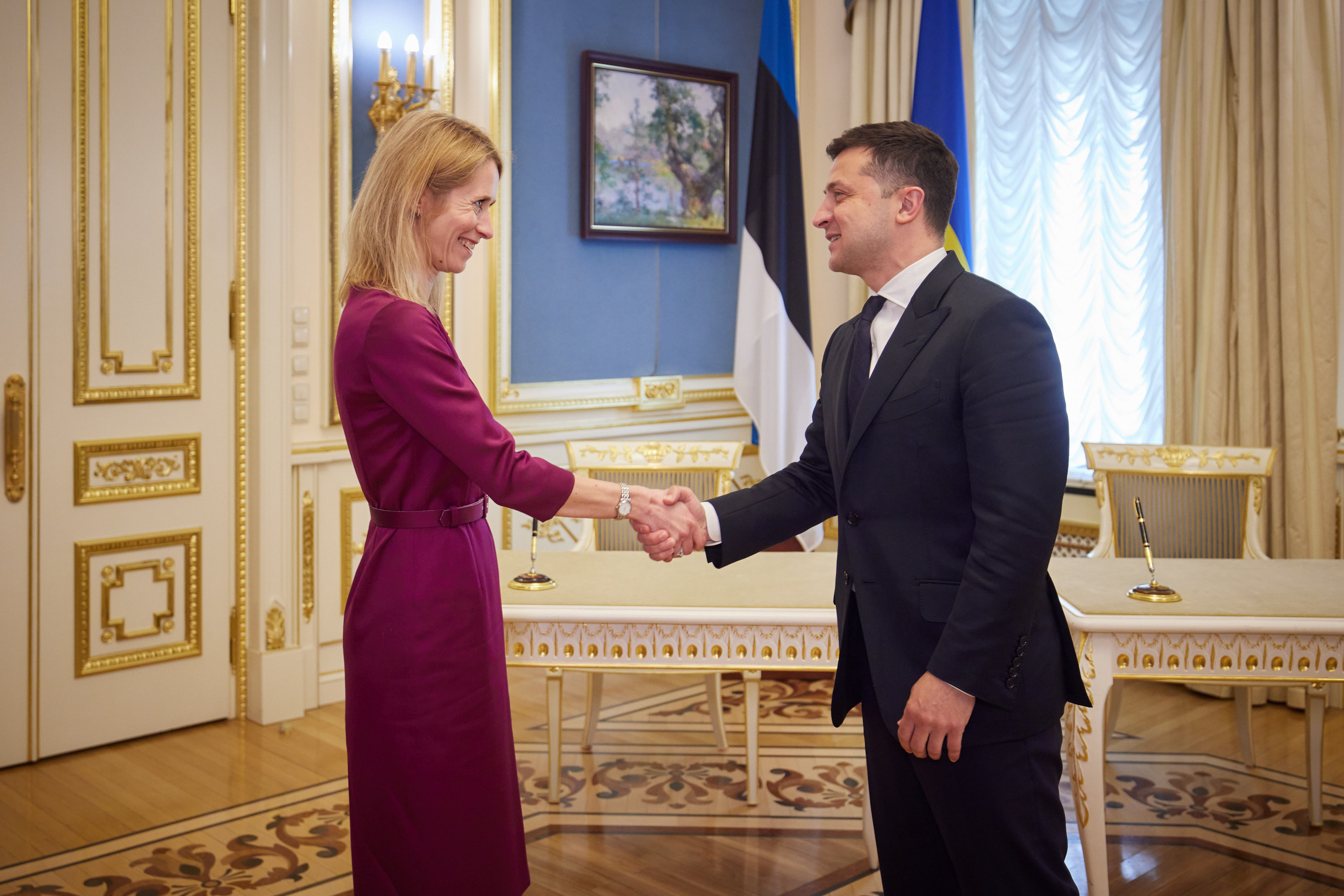
Kallas met with Ukrainian President Volodymyr Zelenskyy in Kyiv, 2021.

During the latter half of 2021, the global energy crisis disrupted the Estonian economy; businesses were forced to temporarily shut down, while the public requested government aid to pay for the high electricity and heating prices. Kallas initially resisted calls for government aid, suggesting that the government should search for long-term solutions rather than handing out benefits, and that a free market should not require consistent government intervention to keep people afloat. The energy crisis nearly caused the collapse of the coalition government. Kallas observed in a speech that the high cost of natural gas coupled with the Russian invasion of Ukraine was driving the increase in energy prices, and that the green energy measures Estonia adopted limited what the government could do to handle the crisis. In January 2022, Kallas announced a 245 million euro plan to reduce the cost of energy from September 2021 to March 2022. The energy crisis impacted her popularity in Estonia.

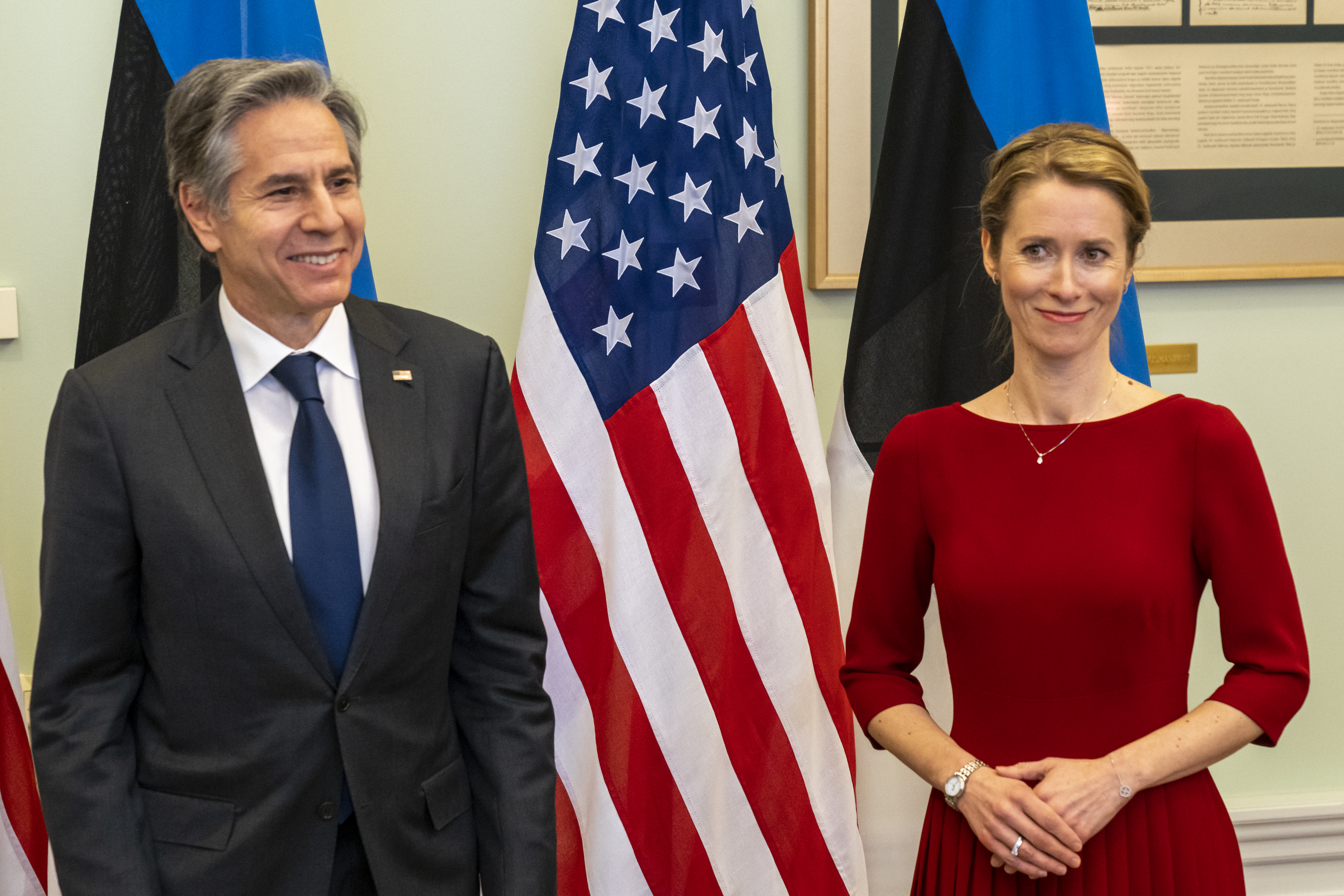
Kallas met with U.S. secretary of state Antony Blinken in Tallinn, 2022.

On the eve of Russia's invasion of Ukraine in January 2022, Kallas said that the Nord Stream 2 natural gas pipeline was "a geopolitical project not an economic one" and urged that the pipeline be terminated. She also stated that Europe's dependence on Russian natural gas was a significant political problem. In January 2022, Kallas committed Estonia to donating howitzers to Ukraine to assist in its defence against a possible Russian invasion, pending German approval as the howitzers were originally purchased from Germany. When Germany delayed in giving an answer, Estonia sent American-made Javelin anti-tank missiles instead in the first weeks of February 2022. Following Russia's recognition of the Donetsk and Luhansk People's Republics, Kallas demanded that the European Union impose sanctions on Russia. Kallas was praised domestically for her leadership during the Russia-Ukraine crisis. Subsequently, her approval rating soared, making her Estonia's most popular politician.

After the Russian invasion of Ukraine started on 24 February 2022, Estonia along with other allies triggered Article 4 of NATO. Kallas pledged to support Ukraine with political and materiel support. By April 2022, 0.8% of Estonia's GDP in military equipment had been handed over to Ukraine. Kallas has been praised both in Estonia and internationally as a leading pro-Ukrainian voice in the war, with the New Statesman calling her "Europe's New Iron Lady". She also strongly supported the admission of Ukraine to the European Union, saying that there was "a moral duty" to do so. In April 2022, she warned against "peace at any price" with Russia.

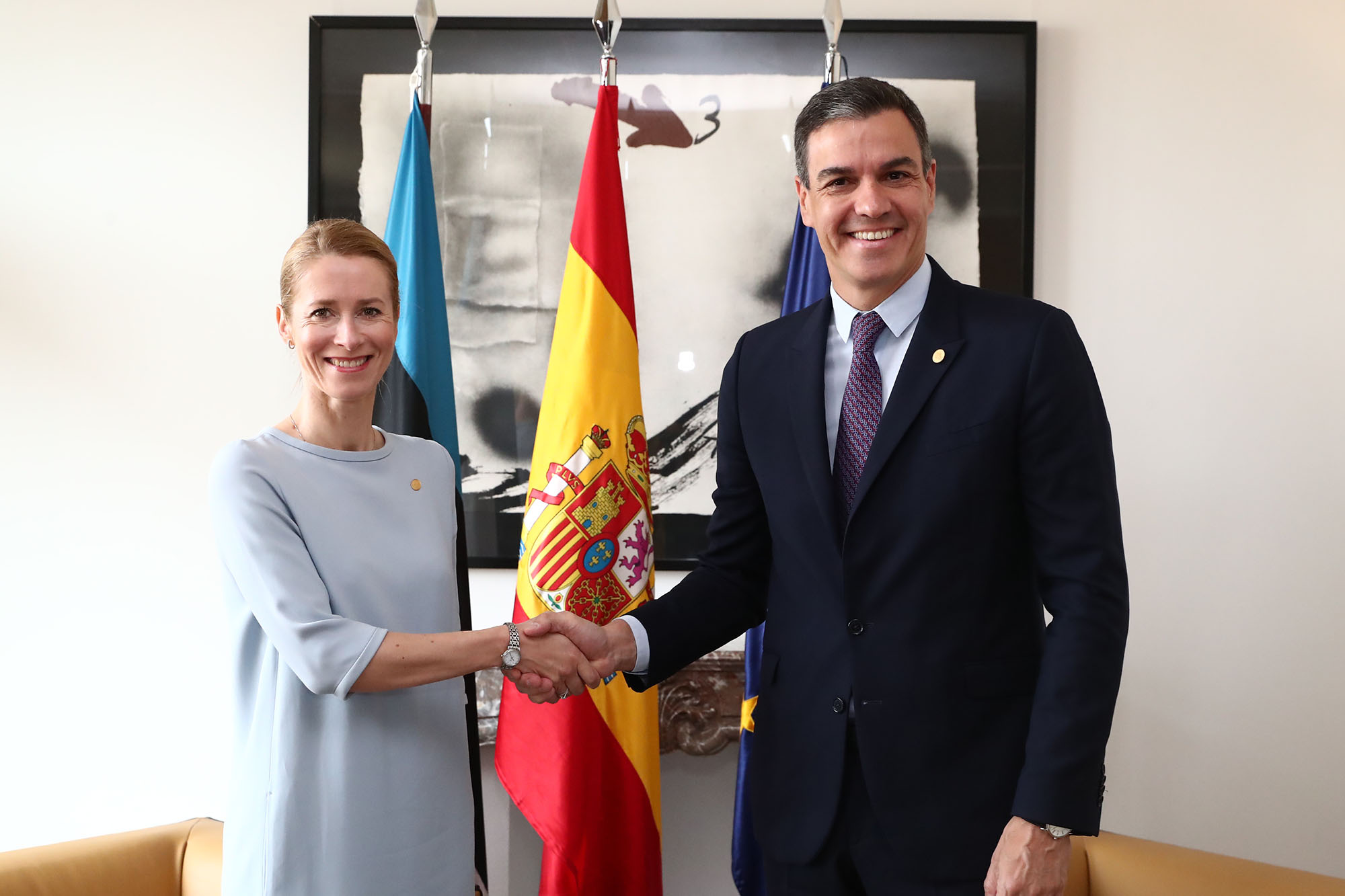
Kallas met with Spanish Prime Minister Pedro Sánchez in Brussels, 2022.

On 3 June 2022, Kallas dismissed all Centre Party ministers, after the Centre Party had sided with the opposition to vote down the preschool education bill, that would have made teaching Estonian language mandatory in preschool. Kallas symbolically resigned on 14 July 2022 to form a new coalition with the Social Democratic Party and Isamaa.

As prime minister, Kallas attracted international attention as a leader in efforts to support Ukraine during the Russian invasion, delivering more military equipment to Ukraine as a proportion of GDP per capita than any other country in the world. In September 2022, in the context of a plan by three other bordering nations to restrict Russian tourists, she said: "Travel to the European Union is a privilege, not a human right." She added that it was "unacceptable that citizens of the aggressor state are able to freely travel in the EU, whilst at the same time people in Ukraine are being tortured and murdered." She rejected any peace agreement that would cede part of Ukrainian territory to Russia.

In September 2022, Kallas announced that Estonia would not grant asylum to Russian citizens fleeing war mobilization, saying that "Every citizen is responsible for the actions of their state, and citizens of Russia are no exception. Therefore, we do not give asylum to Russian men who flee their country. They should oppose the war."

Kallas is a transatlanticist. In February 2023, Kallas was mentioned as a possible candidate to replace NATO Secretary-General Jens Stoltenberg following his expected retirement that same year. She never became an official candidate for the NATO position and eventually supported outgoing Dutch prime minister Mark Rutte who was appointed NATO secretary general in 2024.

In March 2023, Kallas led the Reform Party to a decisive victory in the 2023 parliamentary election, increasing the party's seat count in the Riigikogu by three. Following the election result, Kallas negotiated a coalition government with Estonia 200 and the Social Democratic Party, and her third cabinet was sworn in on 17 April. In June 2023, the government passed a bill legalising same-sex marriage and adoption in Estonia, and the law came into effect on 1 January 2024.

Russia has not changed, the Stalinist evil lives on in Russia.

— Kallas in an interview marking the anniversary of her family's 1949 forcible deportation to then Soviet Siberia.

She supported the legislation to remove Soviet-era monuments that glorified the Soviet Union and the Soviet invasion of Estonia during World War II, with the legislation text stating that "the publicly visible part of a building, as well as a publicly displayed monument, sculpture, memorial and other such facilities, must not incite hatred, or support or justify the activities of an occupation regime, or an act of aggression, genocide, crime against humanity or a war crime."

Kallas condemned Hamas' actions during the Gaza war and expressed her support to Israel and its right to self-defence, but added that Israel "must do so in a way that spares innocent lives and adheres to the norms of international law." She said the conflict in the Middle East "is useful to those seeking to distract the free world from its support for Ukraine."

==== Husband's business ties ====
In August 2023, the media reported that Kallas's husband, Arvo Hallik, had a 24.9% share in the transportation company Stark Logistics, which had continued to transport raw materials to Russia following the Russian invasion of Ukraine, despite Kallas having previously called for Estonian companies to cease operations in Russia. The company had generated approximately €1.5 million in revenue from providing a transport service to a company operating in Russia since the beginning of the invasion.

Kallas later admitted to her husband's share in the company, but denied wrongdoing on the part of herself or her husband and stated that the company's business in Russia was to assist an Estonian client, identified by the Estonian media as the company Metaprint, end its production in Russia, adding that "not a single euro, dollar or ruble" was spent in Russia as part of the activity. Media reported that Kallas had provided an undeclared €350,000 loan to her husband shortly after visiting Metaprint as prime minister in January 2022. Stark Logistics seconded Kallas's claim that the company's dealings in Russia were to assist an Estonian client end their production in the country, and that their work did not contribute to the Russian economy in any way nor did it violate Estonian law, as Kallas's government had prohibited only state-owned companies from working with Russia. The Estonian media has separately reported that Metaprint sold €17 million worth of goods to Russia between the start of the invasion in February 2022 and November 2022. Hallik's business partner Martti Lemendik later admitted in the Estonian media that the company had sold over $32 million in goods on the Russian market between February 2022 and August 2023. The company also collaborated with sanctioned individuals, such as Polish-sanctioned Sergei Kolesnikov. Hallik later stated that he would sell his shares in Stark Logistics.

In context of her husband's activities prime minister Kallas was intensely criticised by leaders of the opposition, and the President of Estonia Alar Karis also stated his worry for seeing "the credibility of the Estonian state called into question, in its relations with its allies". Two public opinion polls conducted at the time showed that 57% and 69% of respondents, respectively, thought Kallas should resign due to the perceived scandal. Kallas continued to refuse to resign in September 2023, calling the controversy a "witch-hunt" by political opponents.

==== Russian arrest warrant ====
On 13 February 2024, the Government of Russia issued a statement that Kallas had been put on the Russian interior ministry's list of wanted criminals. The criminal charges against her are reportedly related to the removal of Soviet-era World War II monuments in Estonia. Kallas is the first head of government known to be added to the register by Russian authorities. Kallas dismissed the warrant as a "scare tactic" by Russia.

=== High Representative of the European Union for Foreign Affairs and Security Policy (2024–present) ===
On 28 June 2024, Kallas was nominated to become High Representative of the Union for Foreign Affairs and Security Policy. A confirmatory vote by the European Parliament took place in November. She formally resigned as prime minister on 15 July, but remained in office until the creation of a new government on 22 July. She also became Vice-President of the European Commission. In November 2024, she stated that the People's Republic of China must pay a "higher cost" for its support to Russia, referring to China's position on Russian invasion of Ukraine.

==== Ukraine ====
On 1 December 2024, her first day in office as High Representative, Kallas visited Ukraine along with European Council President Antonio Costa and Enlargement Commissioner Marta Kos. Kallas expressed strong support for a Ukrainian victory, stating that "the European Union wants Ukraine to win this war". The trip was criticized by Slovak prime minister Robert Fico, who stated, without further elaboration, that Kallas and Costa had made statements that had not been agreed upon by EU bodies.

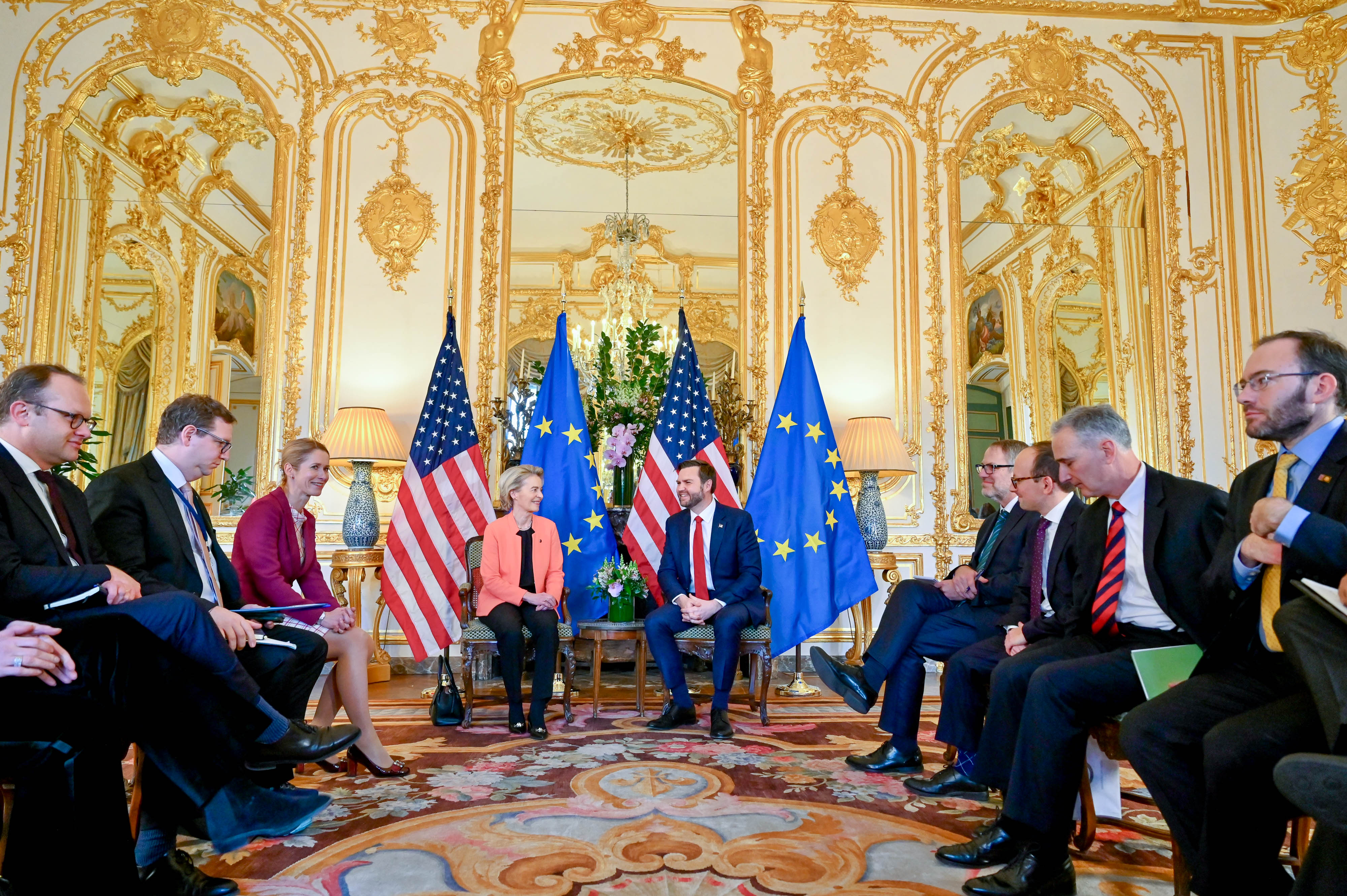
Kallas, European Commission President Ursula von der Leyen and US Vice President JD Vance during the AI Action Summit in Paris, 11 February 2025

On her first day in office, Kallas also warned the Georgian government not to use violence to suppress the ongoing protests against the ruling party's decision to postpone EU accession talks, threatening possible sanctions.

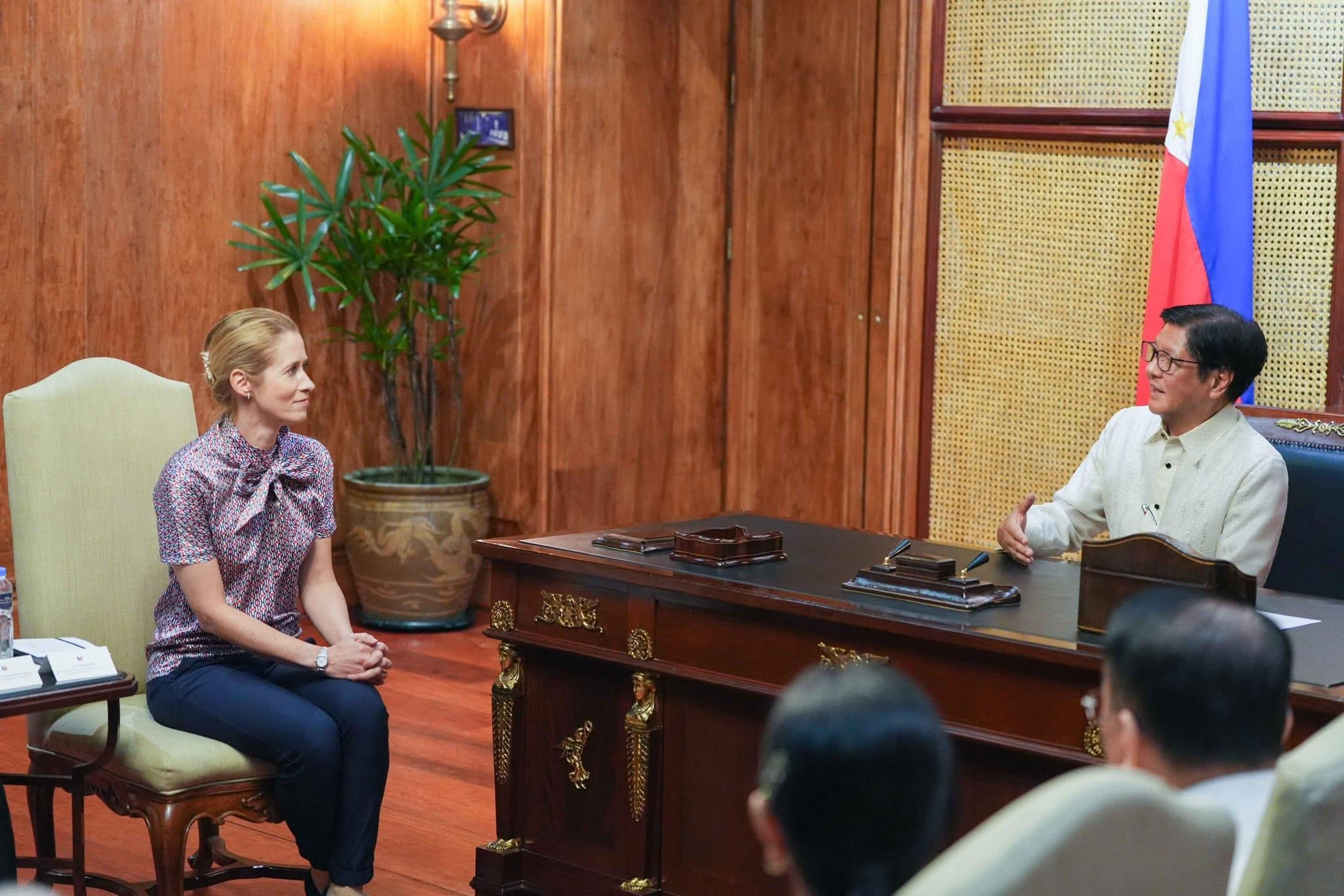
Kallas met with Philippine President Bongbong Marcos in Manila, 2025.

On 11 February 2025, Kallas condemned China in relation to Russia's invasion of Ukraine, saying that "Without China's support, Russia would not be able to continue its military aggression with the same force." She also added "China is the largest provider of dual-use goods and sensitive items that sustain Russia's military-industrial base and that are found on the battlefield in Ukraine."

On 13 February 2025, she criticized a call between US president Donald Trump and Russian president Vladimir Putin as an "appeasement" towards Russia. On 20 February 2025, Kallas expressed doubts about Donald Trump's attempts to negotiate a peace deal in the Russia-Ukraine war, warning that "if we are giving everything on the plate to the aggressor, it sends a signal to all the aggressors in the world that you can do this".

In a 28 February, 2025 Face the Nation interview in Washington, Kallas said the EU and the Trump administration had already drafted a resolution "co-sponsoring together with the United States to support Ukraine, and it was a surprise to us that the U.S. suddenly changed the position...but when they met the Russians something happened after that, because the behavior changed." Kallas was in Washington for a planned meeting with Marco Rubio, United States Secretary of State, to discuss the Russia-Ukraine war. Rubio's office cancelled the meeting after she had already arrived in Washington. A European Commission spokesperson said the cancelation was "due to scheduling issues", but another EU official questioned this explanation.

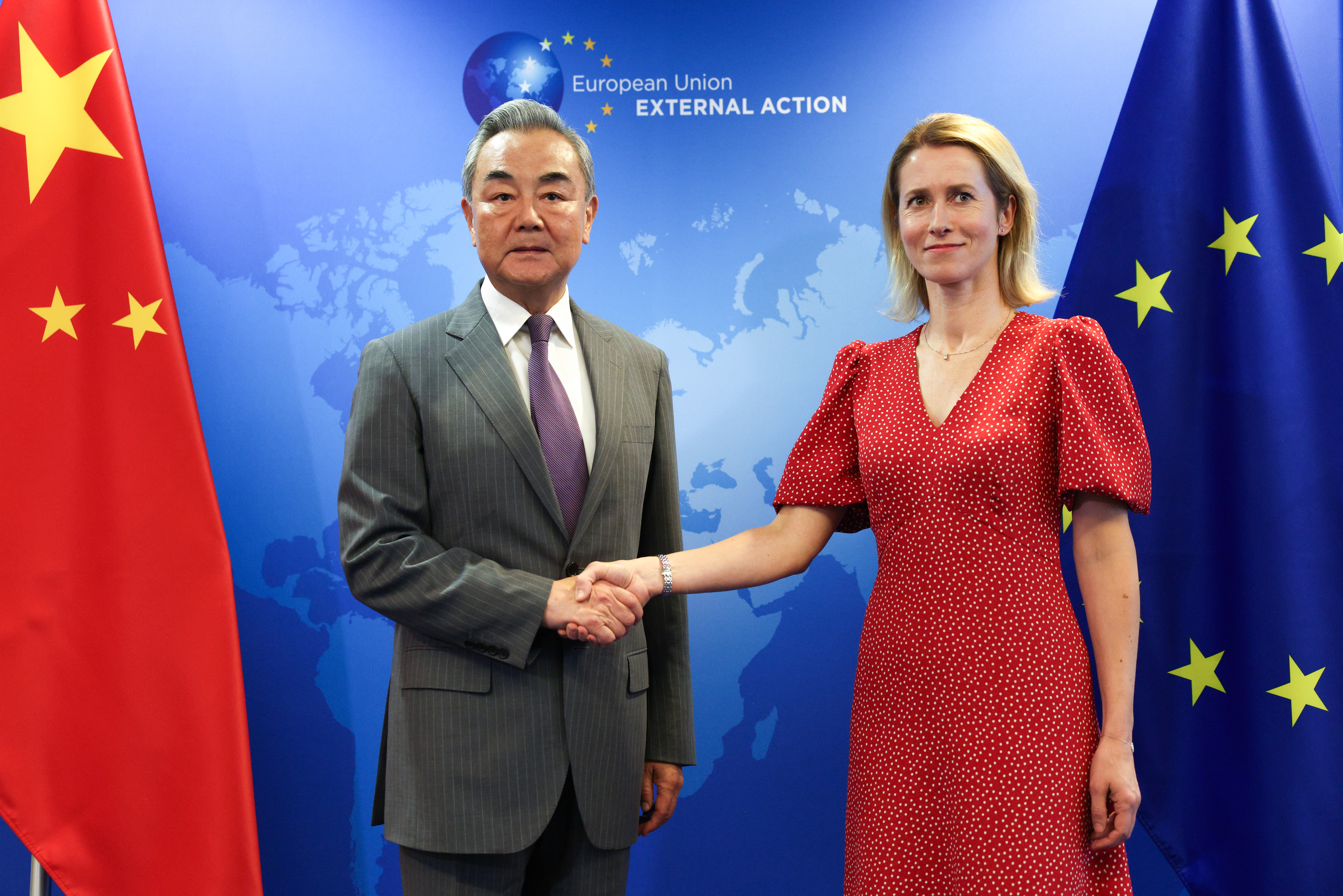
Kallas with Chinese Foreign Minister Wang Yi, 2 July 2025

After the president of the United States, Donald Trump, and his vice president, had a confrontation with the president of Ukraine Volodymyr Zelenskyy on 28 February 2025 in the Oval Office, Kallas concluded on social media: "Today, it became clear that the free world needs a new leader". In a meeting with Kallas in July 2025, Chinese foreign minister Wang Yi stated that China does not want Russia to lose the war in Ukraine. European diplomats said China is concerned that the United States would focus more on Asia once the conflict in Europe is over.

==== Middle East ====
In December 2024, she welcomed the fall of the Assad regime, saying that "Syria shows that Russia is not invincible. We should not underestimate our own power." On 24 February 2025, Kallas announced that the EU lifted sanctions against Syria in some key sectors, such as energy, transport, and banking. On 11 March 2025, she condemned "in the strongest terms" the attacks by pro-Assad militias on Syrian government forces during clashes in western Syria and "welcomed" Syrian president Ahmed al-Sharaa's commitment to launch an investigation into the massacres of Alawite civilians by pro-government Islamist fighters.

While acknowledging differences between Turkey and the EU on issues such as the Cyprus conflict and sanctions against Russia, Kallas praised Turkey's importance as a key NATO ally and called for stronger cooperation between the EU and Turkey. Kallas did not condemn the arrest of Istanbul mayor and presidential candidate Ekrem İmamoğlu. Kallas welcomed the January 2025 ceasefire agreement between Israel and the militant group Hamas. On 24 February 2025, she met with Israeli foreign minister Gideon Sa'ar in Brussels for the first formal talks between Israel and the EU since the Gaza war. The European Commission rejected a request from Ireland and Spain to review the EU–Israel Association Agreement.

On 24 March 2025, in the midst of Israeli attacks on the Gaza Strip, Kallas visited Israel. She stated that "resuming negotiations is the only way to put an end to the suffering on both sides" and warned that "violence feeds more violence." On 15 July 2025, Kallas and the foreign ministers of the EU member states decided not to take any action against Israel over Israeli war crimes in the Gaza war and settler violence in the West Bank. The proposed sanctions against Israel included suspending the EU-Israel Association Agreement, suspending visa-free travel, or blocking imports from Israeli settlements. Gideon Saar considered the EU's decision not to impose sanctions as a diplomatic victory for Israel.

In June 2026, Israeli foreign minister Gideon Saar said that he was severing "all contact" with Kallas following reports that she described Israel's treatment of Palestinians as comparable to Apartheid-era South Africa during a private meeting with Mexican officials. According to Reuters, Sa'ar said he would not resume contact with Kallas unless she retracted the remarks. Kallas responded by expressing appreciation for her conversation with Sa'ar and said that she remained willing to continue dialogue in a "civil and productive manner". She reiterated the European Union's opposition to Israeli settlements in the West Bank and its support for a two-state solution, but did not directly address the reported comment.

==== Other international activities ====
In July 2025, Kallas threatened Georgia under the Georgian Dream government with the suspension of visa liberalisation, suspension of the EU-Georgia Association Agreement, and sanctions. During a panel discussion at the September 2025 conference of the European Union Institute for Security Studies, Kallas remarked, "Russia was [recently] addressing China like, Russia and China, we fought in the Second World War, we won the Second World War, we won the Nazis. And I was, OK, that is something new." In a speech to the conference, the same day, she remarked that "Europe is engaged in a battle for freedom and democracy" and "must build its geopolitical power."

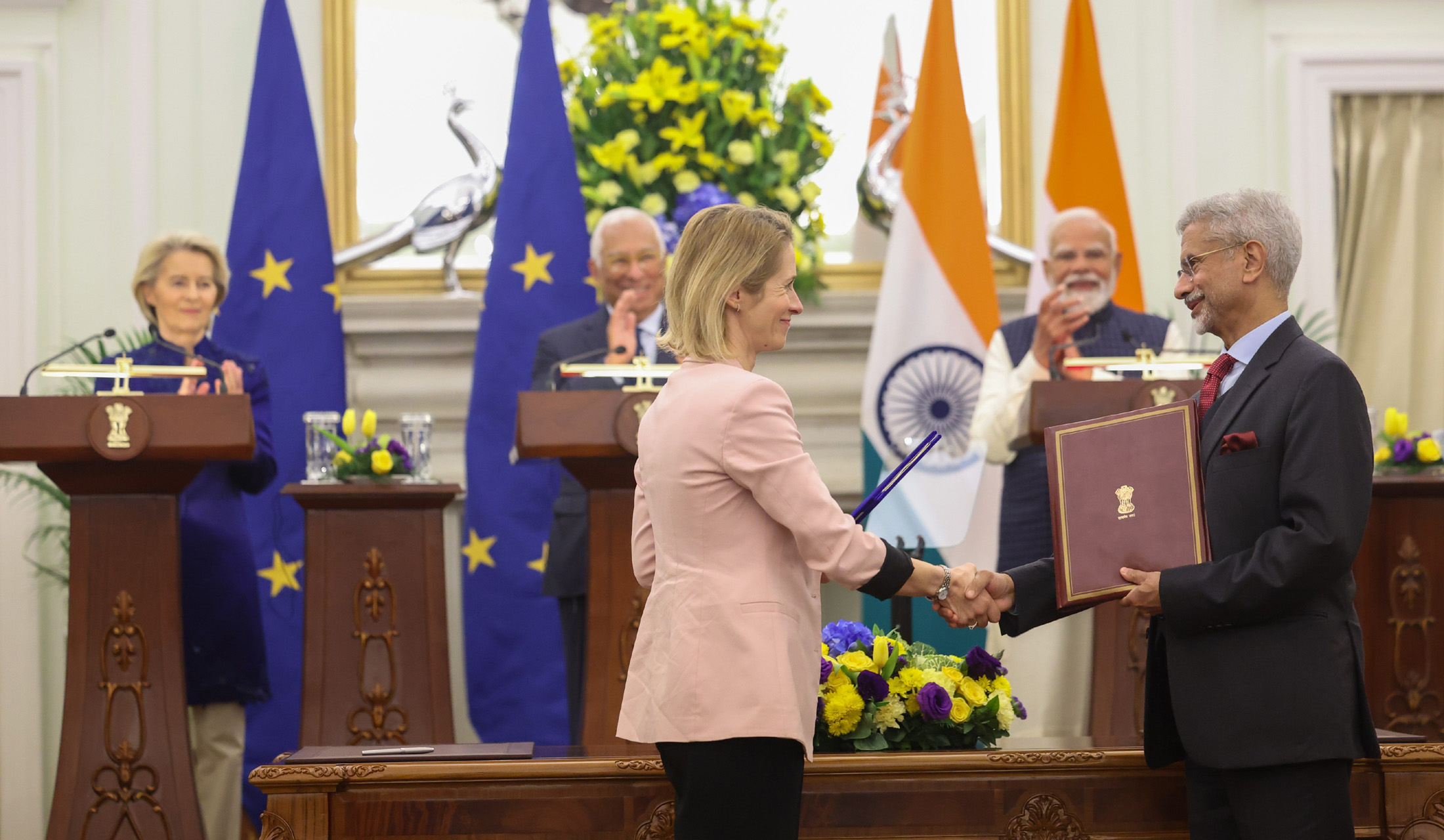
Kallas and Indian External Affairs Minister S. Jaishankar after signing the Security and Defence Partnership in New Delhi, India, 27 January 2026

In September 2025, Kallas announced a new strategic agenda to strengthen EU–India ties, focusing on trade, technology, and defense. She also addressed the India's relationship with Russia, acknowledging disagreements with India over its ties to Russia, including India's participation in the Zapad 2025 military exercise.

On 28 October 2025, Kallas and Hadja Lahbib released a joint statement calling the RSF's seizure of El Fasher a "dangerous turning point" in the Sudanese civil war and condemning the "brutality" of targeting civilians based on ethnicity. They urged immediate de-escalation, adherence to international humanitarian law, and safe, unhindered humanitarian access.

On 27 January 2026, the European Union and India officially finalized negotiations on a India–European Union Free Trade Agreement during the 16th India-EU Summit in New Delhi. Kallas characterized the agreement as a "milestone" for trade, security, and cooperation, emphasizing that global volatility had accelerated the process after nearly two decades of discussions. Alongside the trade deal, Kallas and Indian officials signed a new Security and Defence Partnership.

==== Defending the European External Action Service ====
During 2026, the European External Action Service (EEAS), which operates under the authority of the High Representative and has about 5,000 staff, came under criticism from various European ambassadors and officials, highlighted by a French government discussion paper that listed a number of radical reform options for the EEAS including putting it under the control of the European Commission. Kallas responded that she welcomed a debate about reform, but pointed out that "roles and responsibilities of the EU institutions are clearly defined in the treaties". Her critics responded that while the High Representative role is defined in the Treaty of Lisbon, the EEAS is established by the Council of the European Union so can be changed.

== Personal life ==
From 2002 to 2006, Kallas was married to Roomet Leiger. She lived together with former finance minister and businessman Taavi Veskimägi. Kallas and Veskimägi have one son; they separated in 2014. In 2018, she married Arvo Hallik, a banker and investor. Hallik has two children from a previous relationship. Apart from her native Estonian, Kallas is fluent in English, Finnish, Russian and French. She is known for reading history books, and is friends with historians Timothy Garton Ash and Timothy Snyder.

== Honours ==
=== State decorations ===
- Order of the National Coat of Arms, 2nd Class (Estonia, 5 February 2025)
- Grand Cross of the Order of the Star of Romania (2021)
- Commander Grand Cross of the Royal Order of the Polar Star (Sweden, 2023)
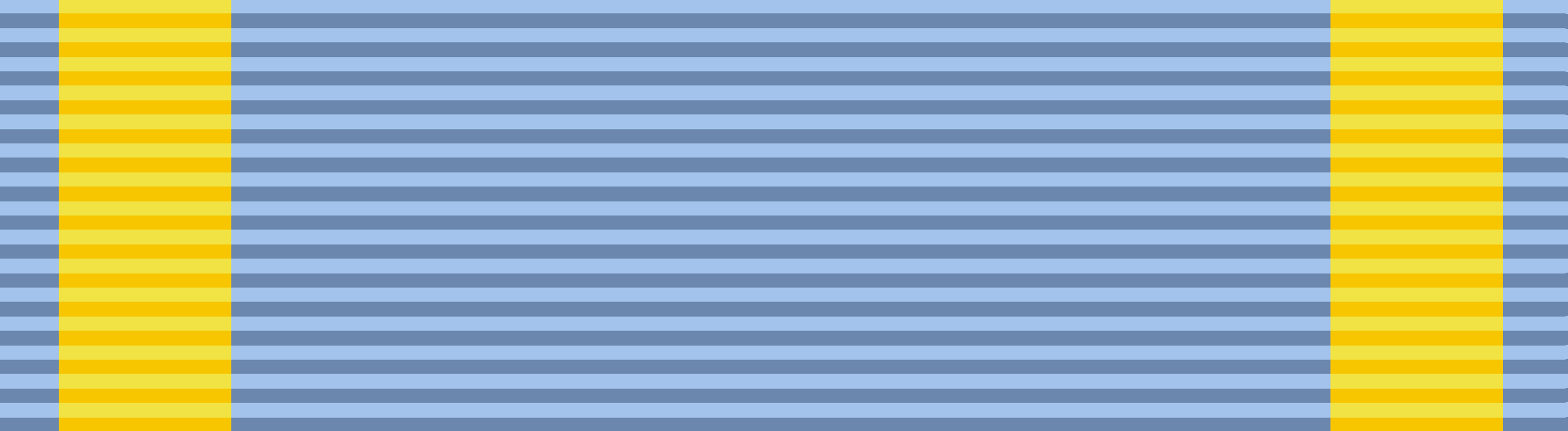
- Order of Prince Yaroslav the Wise, 2nd class (Ukraine, 2023)

=== Awards and prizes ===
- Transatlantic Leadership Award awarded by the Center for European Policy Analysis (2022)
- Grotius Prize awarded by Policy Exchange (2022)
- European Prize for Political Culture awarded by the Hans Ringier Foundation (2022)
- International Prize awarded by the Friedrich August von Hayek Foundation (2022)
- Jeane J. Kirkpatrick Award awarded by the International Republican Institute (2023)
- Marion Dönhoff Prize for International Understanding and Reconciliation awarded by the ZEIT Foundation Ebelin and Gerd Bucerius (2023)
- International Lord Byron Prize awarded by the Society for Hellenism and Philhellenism, in collaboration with the Academy of Athens (2023)
- Walther Rathenau Award awarded by the Walther Rathenau Institut (2024)

== Other activities ==
Since 2020, Kallas has been a member of the board of trustees of the Friends of Europe. Additionally, she is a member of the European Council on Foreign Relations, an advisory board member of the Women Economic Forum, and a patron of the Model European Union Tallinn. She is also a mentor of the European Liberal Youth, a member of the European Young Leaders, a MEP ambassador of Erasmus for Young Entrepreneurs, a member of the MEP Library Lovers Group, a political member of the European Internet Forum, a member of the extended board of the European Forum for Renewable Energy Sources, a member of the Global Young Leaders, a member of the Women Political Leaders, and a MEP ambassador of the European Entrepreneurship Education Network.

== See also ==
- List of international prime ministerial trips made by Kaja Kallas

Political offices
| Preceded by Jüri Ratas | Prime Minister of Estonia; 2021–2024 | Succeeded by Kristen Michal |
| Preceded by Josep Borrell | Vice-President of the European Commission; 2024–present | Incumbent |
| Preceded by Josep Borrell | High Representative of the European Union for Foreign Affairs and Security Policy; 2024–present | Incumbent |
Party political offices
| Preceded by Hanno Pevkur | Leader of the Reform Party; 2018–2024 | Succeeded by Kristen Michal |
Academic offices
| Preceded by Ursula von der Leyen | Invocation Speaker of the College of Europe; 2025 | Most recent |
