= Roomet Leiger =

- Born: 8 April 1977 (age 49)
- Education: University of Szeged; Estonian Maritime Academy; Tallinn University; University of Tartu; Latvian Maritime Academy
- Occupation: Maritime engineer

Roomet Leiger (born 8 April 1977) is an Estonian maritime engineer. Since 1 May 2015, he has been the Director of the Estonian Maritime Academy.

He graduated from the University of Szeged in 1995. In 2000 he graduated from the Estonian Maritime Academy with a degree in marine engineering, and in 2008 from Tallinn University. The topic of his master's thesis was "Optimisation of the state's oil spill response capacity in the coastal sea of Western Estonia on the example of planned ship shelters". From 2008 to 2016, he studied for a doctoral degree at the University of Tartu and studied the assessment of the ecological risk of marine oil spills, but did not defend his doctoral thesis. In 2021, he enrolled in doctoral studies at the Latvian Maritime Academy.

== Career ==
He has worked as a motorist at AS Estline-Eesti (1997–1999), as a watch mechanic at AS Tallink Grupp (2000–2004), as a lecturer and project manager at the Estonian Maritime Academy (2005–2013), as a senior specialist, assistant project manager and as a senior specialist in financial accounting for European Union projects at the Estonian Marine Institute of the University of Tartu (2006–2015).

From 2008 to 2012, he was the acting dean of the Faculty of Mechanical Engineering of the Estonian Maritime Academy, from 2008 to 2012 the project manager of the Rescue Board, from 2013 to 2014 the Vice Rector for Development and Acting Rector of the Estonian Maritime Academy.

From 2013, he worked as a project manager at Tallinn University of Technology and from 2014 as the acting director of the Estonian Maritime Academy at TUT.

Since 1 May 2015, he has been working as the Director of the Estonian Maritime Academy.

== Membership ==
- Chairman of the Supervisory Board of the Estonian Maritime Museum Foundation
- Member of the Supervisory Board of AS Eesti Loots
- Member of the Estonian Shipowners' Association
- Member of the Maritime Advisory Board
- Member of the Estonian Association of Marine Engineers
- Member of the Tallinn Rotary Club
- member of the club Eesti Karavan

== Recognition ==
- 2014 – Medal of Merit of the Border Guard
- 2019 – Tallinn University Alumnus of the Century

== Personal life ==
From 2002 to 2006, he was married to Kaja Kallas.

Since 2011, he has been married to Marily Leiger; they have a son and a daughter.
