= Rebenok =

Rebenok (Russian: Ребено́к) is a Russian surname. Notable people with this surname include:

- Aleksandra Rebenok (born 1980), Russian actress
- Pavlo Rebenok (born 1985), Ukrainian football player
- Pavels Rebenoks (1980 - 2020) Latvian sworn advocate and politician of Russian descent
- Tretiy Rebenok, character in Metal Gear
