= Kert Kesküla =

Estonian basketball player

Kert "Kessu" Kesküla
Personal information
- Born: January 13, 1975 Saue Parish, Estonia
- Died: September 28, 2011 (aged 36) Tallinn, Estonia

Career information
- Playing career: 1994–2008

Career history
- 1994–1996: Estonian national basketball team
- 1990s: Baltika
- 1990s: TTÜ/A. Le Coq
- 2006–2008: Forssa Koripojat (Finland)

Kert "Kessu" Kesküla (13 January 1975 – 28 September 2011) was an Estonian basketball player.

== Early life ==
Kesküla was born 13 January 1975 in Saue Parish. In 2001 he graduated from International University Audentes.

== Career ==
From 1994 until 1996 he was a member of Estonian national basketball team. He also played on two teams: Baltika and TTÜ/A. Le Coq. From 2006 to 2008 he played on Finnish club Forssa Koripojat.

== Death ==
On 26 September 2011, Kesküla, aged 36, was lured to a deserted wooded location in the Tallinn district of Lasnamäe through an internet conversation with a teenage girl who offered Kesküla sex in exchange for money. When Kesküla arrived at the location, he was beaten and stabbed to death in a planned robbery committed by the girl and three other teenage accomplices: two boys and another girl. The four youths were arrested and charged with the murder within a week of the crime and all four were sentenced to prison.

Kesküla was buried in Liiva Cemetery in Tallinn.
