= Liiva Cemetery =

Cemetery in Tallinn, Estonia

Coordinates: 59.376°N 24.732°E

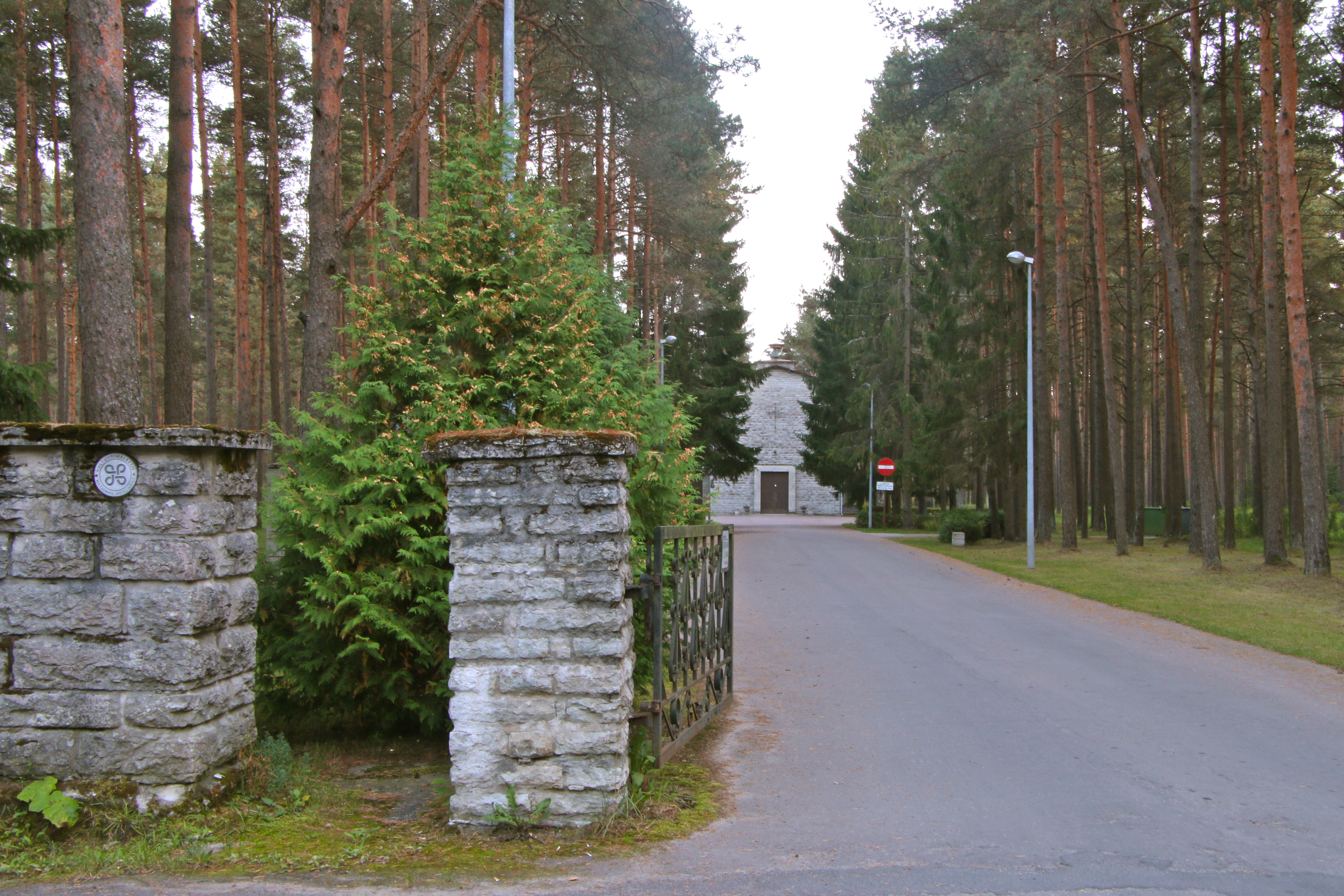
Liiva kalmistu

Liiva Cemetery (Estonian: Liiva kalmistu) is a cemetery near Ülemiste Lake, Tallinn, Estonia. Its area is 65 ha.

The cemetery was opened in 1935. The cemetery's chapel was also opened in 1935. The chapel was designed by Herbert Johanson. The first burial was politician Hans Martinson.

== Burials ==
- Dajan Ahmet
- Eduard Alver
- Rein Aun
- Marie Heiberg
- Herbert Johanson
- Kert Kesküla
- Arnold Meri
- Aleksander Promet
- Marie Reisik
- Evald Tipner
- Aarne Üksküla
