= Karoli Hindriks =

Estonian entrepreneur (born 1983)

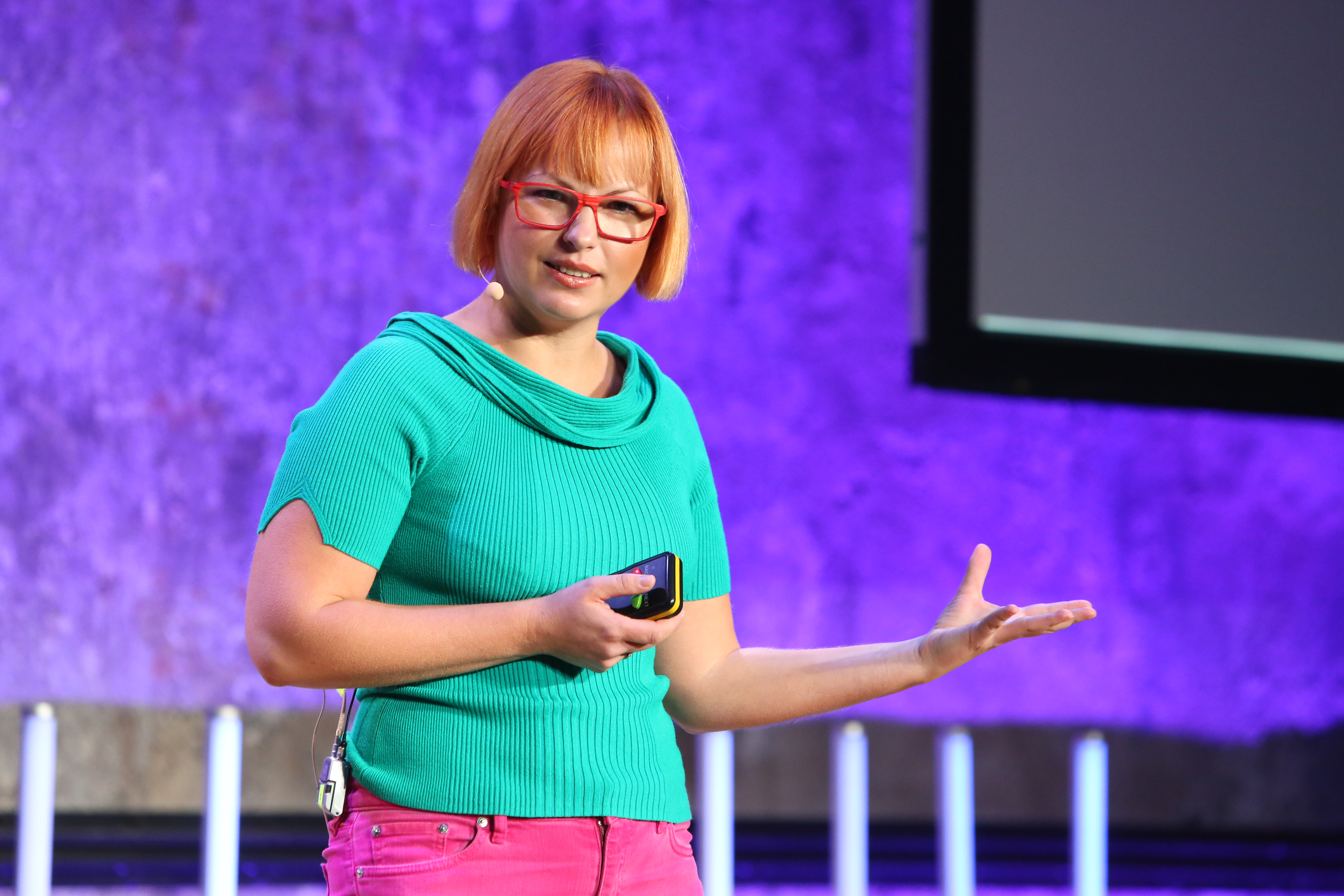
- Karoli Hindriks (2017)
- Born: Karoli Hindriks; 17 June 1983 (age 43); Kohtla-Järve, then part of Estonian SSR, Soviet Union
- Education: Estonian Business School
- Occupation: entrepreneur
- Years active: 1999–present
- Known for: CEO MTV Estonia

Karoli Hindriks (born 1983) is an Estonian entrepreneur who in 2014 founded the relocation technology company Jobbatical which she heads as CEO. In 1999, when only 16, she started a student company which made fabric soft reflectors for pedestrians and in 2007 was appointed CEO of the television station MTV Estonia.

== Early life and education ==
Born in Kohtla-Järve on 17 June 1983, Karoli Hindriks was brought up in Pärnu where she attended the local high school. In 2008, she graduated in International Business Administration from the Estonian Business School in Tallinn.

== Career ==
When she was 16, she participated in a school fashion project which led to her inventing a soft reflector for pedestrians which could be worn as clothing or jewellery. Encouraged by her father, she successfully applied for a patent, becoming the youngest inventor in Estonia.

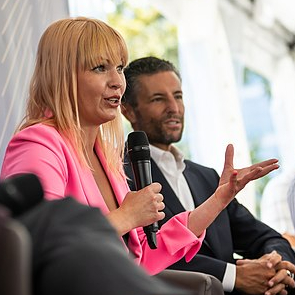
In 2022

In 2006, in her role as marketing manager, she helped to establish MTV in Estonia and worked in marketing and public relations for MTV Baltics. Half a year after the launch, when she was just 23, she was appointed CEO of MTV Estonia, the youngest MTV CEO ever. From 2009, she was charged by Fox to bring their television channels to Estonia and the Baltic States. In all, she successfully launched seven channels.

In 2012, while following a graduate programme at Singularity University in California, Hindriks was inspired to found Jobbatical, a company which could connect technical and media people from around the world with those who were interested in hiring them. Founded in 2014, the company quickly grew to serve over 100,000 users from over 50 countries.

In 2022 Jobbatical pivoted from relocation platform to immigration platform and raised 11,6 M Euros to support worker migration going paperless.
