= Eduard Alver =

Estonian military personnel

Eduard Alver (15 March 1886, in Valga – 15 August 1939, in Tallinn) was an Estonian lawyer, policeman, politician, and commander of the Estonian Defence League (Kaitseliit) during the 1918–1920 Estonian War of Independence.

From 1906 to 1911, Alver studied medicine at the University of Vienna. He also studied law at the University of Tartu, and received his master's degree in law at Moscow University. From 4 April 1919 to 24 October 1919, he was the commander of the Estonian Defence League. From 1935 until 1936, he was the executive director of Eesti Kultuurfilm. Alver died in 1939 and was buried in Liiva Cemetery in Tallinn.

Alver's grandson Siim Kallas and great-granddaughter Kaja Kallas later both became prime ministers of Estonia.

== Awards ==
- 1929: Order of the Cross of the Eagle, II class.
