= Baltic Council of Ministers =

Institution for intergovernmental cooperation between the Baltic states

The Baltic Council of Ministers (BCM) (Lithuanian: Baltijos Ministrų Taryba, Latvian: Baltijas Ministru padome, Estonian: Balti Ministrite Nõukogu) is an institution for intergovernmental cooperation between the Baltic states: Latvia, Lithuania and Estonia established in 1994. It has decision-making powers only if representatives of all three Baltic states are present and decisions are made by consensus. A similar institution is the Baltic Assembly, an institution for parliamentary co-operation among the Baltic states, established on November 8, 1991 (it operates by the statutes entered in force on October 31, 1993). The two closely cooperate, with formal mechanisms, the trilateral agreement on governmental and parliamentary co-operation and protocols on specific cooperation mechanisms established in 2003-2004.

== Organization and functions ==
The BCM was established on June 13, 1994 at the meeting of the Heads of Government of the Baltic States in Tallinn.

The highest decision making body of the BCM is the Prime Ministers' Council, which meets at least once a year.

The BCM Co-operation Council consists of the Ministers of Foreign Affairs of the Baltic States.

The operation of the Council is ensured by its Secretariat that consists of government officials of the member states in charge of the cooperation.

The activities in specific domains of cooperation are managed by Committees of Senior Officials. These Committees include one senior official from the corresponding ministry of the member countries, as well as experts. The major standing Committees of Senior Officials are in defense, energy, home affairs, transport and communications, and environment.

In the areas not covered by the committees, task forces may be created to handle specific issues.

== See also ==
- Council of the Baltic Sea States
