= Borenius =

Law firm in Finland

- Headquarters: Helsinki
- Major practice areas: Corporate law
- Key people: Casper Herler (Managing Partner); Samuli Simojoki (Chair)
- Revenue: EUR 37.9 million (2014)
- Date founded: 1911
- Website: borenius.com

Borenius Attorneys Ltd, founded in 1911, is a Finnish law firm that specialises in corporate law. Borenius was ranked as the Most Innovative Law Firm of the Year in the 2019 edition of IFLR and received top rankings also in the Legal 500 EMEA and Chambers Global directories in 2020. Between 2015 and 2019, Borenius has been involved in roughly 40% of the NASDAQ Helsinki listings.

Borenius has approximately 200 employees in four jurisdictions. Borenius is headquartered in Helsinki, and maintains another Finnish office in Tampere. In 2012, Borenius opened an office in New York City under the name Borenius Attorneys LLP. In 2013, Borenius’ subsidiary company Borenius Attorneys Russia Ltd. was opened in St. Petersburg, Russia. Borenius’ global reach expanded further in 2020 when the firm opened a representative office in London.

The firm's Chair of the Board is Samuli Simojoki and the Managing Partner is Casper Herler. All partners of the firm are members of the Finnish Bar Association.

== History ==
In 1911, Kaarlo Viktor Holma and Ludvig Ilmari Palmén founded a law firm in Helsinki. This firm, Palmén & Holma, served its clients in family and inheritance law related matters as well as in insurance law related questions. In 1915, Palmén left the company and was succeeded by Heikki Borenius Sr., at which time the name of the firm was changed to Holma & Borenius. Holma left the firm in 1930. Following this, Borenius changed the name of the firm to Asianajotoimisto Heikki Borenius (English: Attorney at Law Heikki Borenius), and the firm started focusing also on contract and business law cases.

After the Second World War, Borenius invited Henrik Castrén to join as a partner in 1944. The name of the firm was changed to Asianajotoimisto Borenius & Castrén (English: Attorneys at Law Borenius & Castrén), and the focus of the firm was shifted to business and contract law. Borenius' son Heikki Antero Borenius joined the firm in 1947. Castrén left the firm in 1957, after which Borenius Jr. was made partner. The name of the firm was changed to Asianajotoimisto Borenius & Borenius (English: Attorneys at Law Borenius & Borenius).

In 1961, Borenius Sr. turned 75 and offered his share in the company to Kullervo Kemppinen. In 1962, Borenius died and Kemppinen became a partner. The name of the firm was changed to Asianajotoimisto Borenius & Kemppinen (English: Attorneys at Law Borenius & Kemppinen). In the 1960s, the firm's clients were mainly large corporations and operators in the industrial sector.

In the 1980s, the firm handled assignments related to significant publicly funded construction projects as well as criminal proceedings regarding corporate management's liability. In the early 1990s, the number of insolvency cases increased due to the economic recession that hit Finland. During the 90s, the firm assisted companies especially in corporate restructurings and listings of new companies particularly in high-tech.

In 2000, the firm began cooperation through the Borenius Group with associated offices in Tallinn, Estonia and Riga, Latvia. In 2002, a new office was opened at Innopoli in Otaniemi, Espoo to support start-up companies especially in the technology sector. In 2004, Borenius Group expanded to Lithuania and began cooperation with a new associated office in Vilnius. In 2009, the leading law firm in maritime and logistics assignments Aminoff & Weissenberg merged into Borenius & Kemppinen.

The name Asianajotoimisto Borenius (English: Attorneys at Law Borenius) was launched in 2011 in connection with the firm's 100th anniversary celebrations. In 2012, Borenius opened a group office in New York under the name Borenius Attorneys LLP. In 2013, another office in St Petersburg was opened under the name Borenius Attorneys Russia Ltd. In 2015, Borenius moved to new premises in the heart of the city's financial and business district at Eteläesplanadi 2, which was previously the headquarters of the Finnish forest industry giant UPM. That same year, the Borenius group offices in Tallinn, Riga and Vilnius were transferred to Cobalt Legal, an alliance of top-tier law offices across the Baltic states. The firm's official English name was changed to Borenius Attorneys Ltd. In 2017, the name of the firm was changed to Borenius Asianajotoimisto Oy.
