= Pavels Rebenoks =

Latvian advocate and politician (1980–2020)

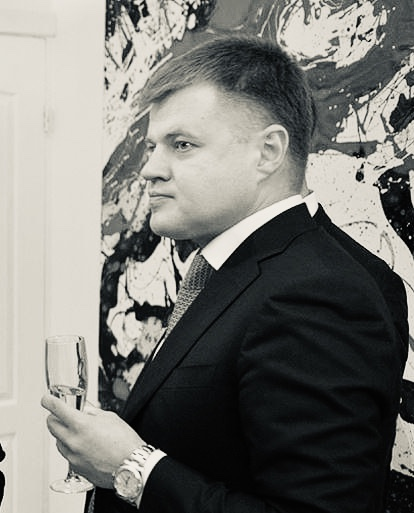
- Born: Pavel Rebenok; August 4, 1980
- Died: September 20, 2020 (aged 40); Langstini, Latvia
- Education: Latvian Maritime Academy, University of Latvia
- Occupations: lawyer, politician

Pavels Rebenoks (4 August 1980 - 20 September 2020) was a Latvian sworn advocate and politician of Russian descent.

== Early life and education ==
Rebenoks was born on August 4, 1980, and graduated from the Latvian Maritime Academy in 2003 with a degree in ship management, and graduated from the Faculty of Law of the University of Latvia in 2005.

== Career ==
In 2003, Rebenoks became the adviser to Einars Repše the former Prime Minister of Latvia on maritime and port issues. Later, he was appointed adviser to the former Minister of Finance Valdis Dombrovskis on the Port of Ventspils. Rebenoks served as a representative of the Ministry of Finance on the Port of Ventspils until the resignation of the government which was led by Repše in March 2004. In 2005, he ran in the Riga City Council elections and the Saeima elections of 2006 from the list of New Era Party led by Repše. Through the period from September 2018 to April 2019, Rebenoks was the chairman of the supervisory board of Olainfarm. In February 2019, Rebenoks became a freelance adviser to Ralfs Nemiro the former Economics Minister of Latvia. In the same month, he became a Member of the Board of the Riga Freeport Authority. From June to July 2019, he was the chairman of the supervisory board of Latvenergo. In February 2020, he was elected deputy chairman of the Board of the Riga Freeport Authority.

== Death ==
In 2019, Rebenoks, when he was the chairman of the pharmaceutical company Olainfarm, reported to the State Police chief and the head of the State Security Service that he received threats on his life, but had not revealed how or who had expressed the threats. On the night of September 20, 2020, Rebenoks was murdered at his home in Langstiņi which is potentially related to his professional activities.
