= Latvian Maritime Academy =

Coordinates: 57°02′47″N 24°01′49″E

- Latvijas Jūras akadēmija
- Established: 8 January 1993; 33 years ago
- Academic staff: 36 (2017/2018)
- Students: 916 (2015/2016)
- Location: Flotes 12 k-1, Riga, Latvia
- Language: Latvian
- Website: http://www.latja.lv

Latvian Maritime Academy (LMA; Latvian: Latvijas Jūras akadēmija) — Maritime academy, located in Riga, Latvia. It awards degrees below the doctoral level, and is the only institution in Latvia that grants university-level degrees in the maritime sector. In the 2015/2016 academic year, 237 students were admitted and 916 students in total were attending the academy.

== History ==
The Latvian Maritime Academy enrolled the first students as part of the Kaliningrad Institute of Fishing Industries on 1 October 1989. This year is considered the foundation year of the LMA. From 25 July 1990 to 8 January 1993 the LMA belonged to the Riga Technical University as one of the faculties. The LMA was established as an independent tertiary education public institution on 8 January 1993, when it got its first accreditation. In 2013, officials from the Latvian Ministry of Education and the Riga Technical University proposed the LMA to enter negotiations on merging back with the Riga Technical University. However, as of May 2018, the start of these negotiations has not been confirmed.

The Latvian Maritime Academy takes part in the Erasmus+ programme. Partnerships for student exchange have been established, for instance, with the Estonian Maritime Academy, the Piri Reis University and the Gdynia Maritime University.

== Bachelor programmes ==
LMA offers four bachelor study programmes.

- Maritime Transports department: "Marine Transportation – Navigation", "Port and Shipping Management".
- Marine Engineering department: "Maritime transport – Marine Engineering", "Maritime transport – Marine Electrical Automation".

== Master programmes ==
LMA offers one master study programme.

- Maritime Transport department: "Operation of Marine Transportation"
