= Estonian Business School =

Business school in Tallinn, Estonia

- Other name: EBS
- Type: Private non-profit
- Established: 1988
- Founder: Madis Habakuk
- Chancellor: Mart Habakuk
- Rector: Meelis Kitsing
- Location: A. Lauteri 3, Tallinn, Tallinn, Estonia; 59°25′56″N 24°45′24″E
- Website: www.ebs.ee/en/
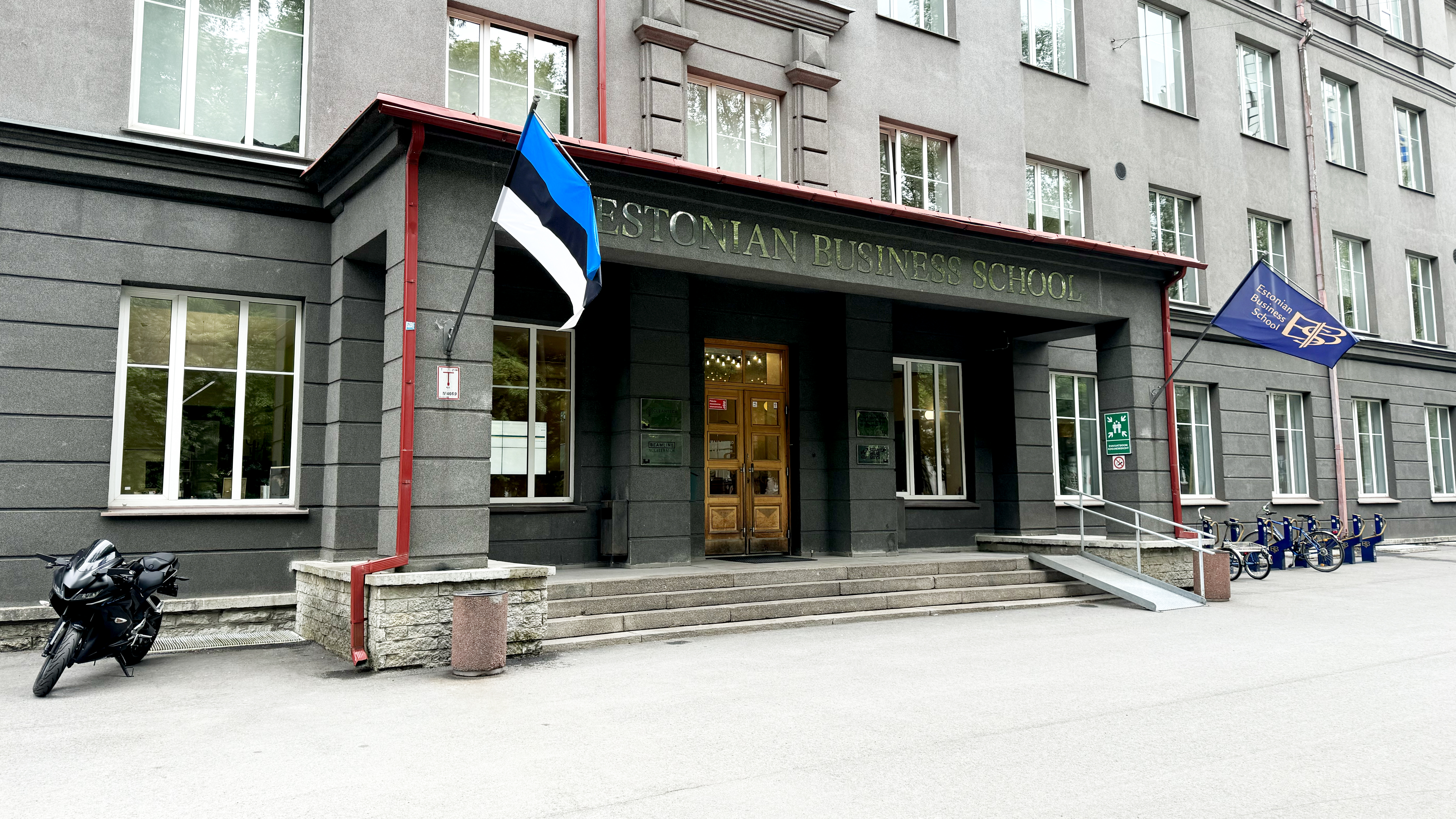

Estonian Business School (EBS) is a private, higher-education university situated in Tallinn, Estonia. EBS offers business-related higher education in bachelor's-, master's- and doctoral levels. Estonian Business School also has a high school, named EBS Gümnaasium which offers high school education from 10th to 12th grade and a Executive Education Centre (EBS Juhtimiskoolituse Keskus) that offers different trainings and development programs.

== History ==
The Estonian Business School (EBS) was founded in 1988. The founders of the university were Professor Madis Habakuk (Estonia), Professor Marshall Fitzgerald (USA), Professor Rein Peterson (Canada) and Ilmar Martens (Canada). It was the first higher-education institution in the Soviet Union that offered an English language-based business education. The need for the creation of a new business-oriented curriculum was imminent during those times, in the light of perestroika.

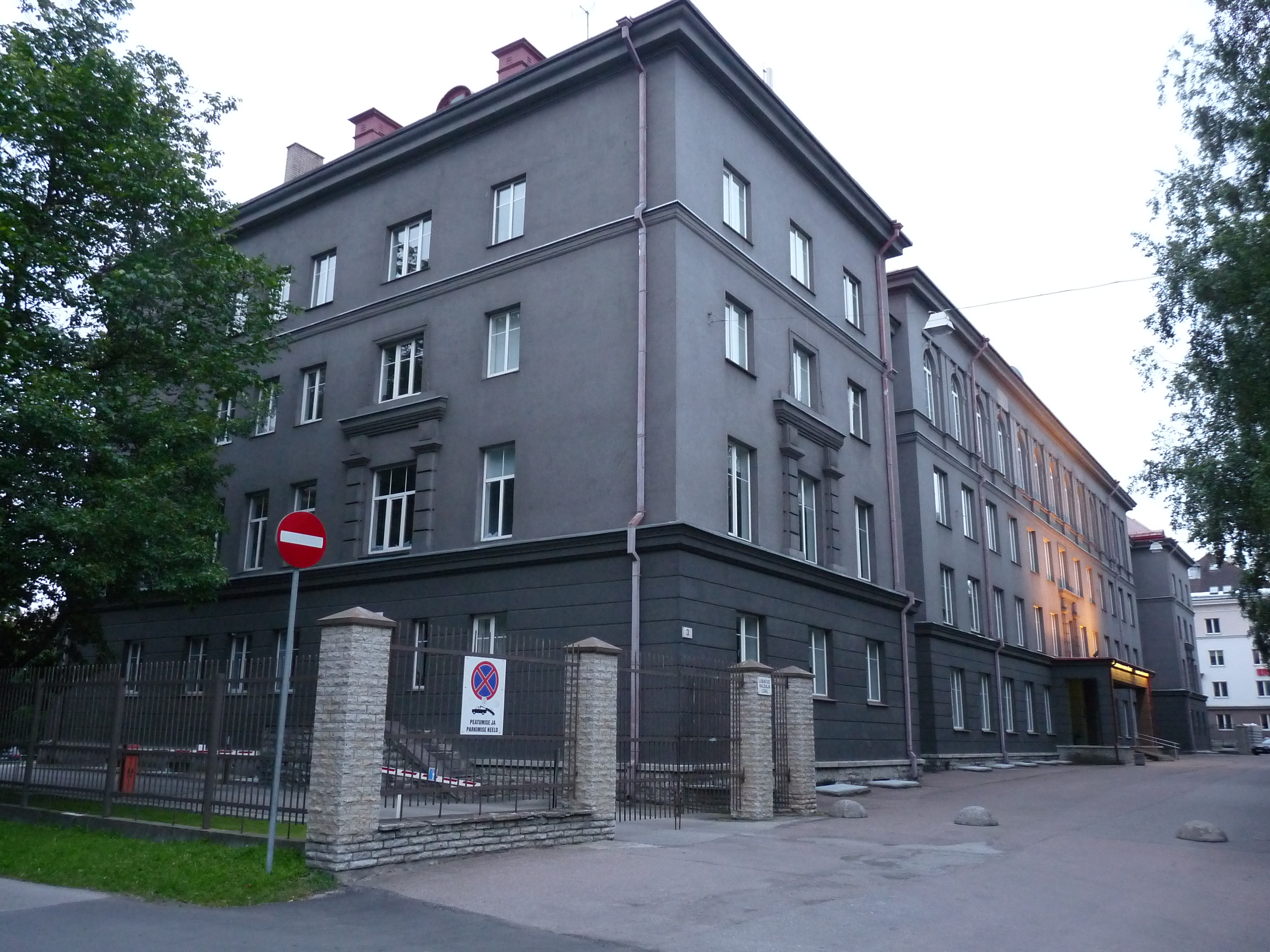
Building of EBS in Tallinn

== Today ==
Approximately 1,400 students are currently studying at EBS, and the school has partnership contracts with over 70 universities in Europe, America, Australia, and Asia.

All EBS Bachelor's, Master's and Doctoral programmes have been accredited by the Ministry of Education and Science of the Republic of Estonia. EBS is internationally accredited by the Central and East Europe Management Development Association (CEEMAN). Eduniversal (University ranking which provides information on the best Business Schools Eduniversal rankings) has awarded 4 Palmes to EBS. 4 Palmes excellence are only awarded to the top 200 business schools in the world. The 200 schools in the 4 Palmes League category are regarded as the 'Top business schools with significant international influence'. In 2014/15, it reached position 141.

== Eedu ==
Eedu is a under-construction highrise in Estonia. It is located next to Estonian Business School, Tallinn.

Eedu
- Eedu

General information
- Status: Under construction
- Location: Tallinn, Estonia
- Groundbreaking: 2023
- Construction started: 2025
- Estimated completion: 2027
- Cost: €69 million
- Owner: Estonian Business School

Height
- Height: 105 m (344 ft 6 in)

Technical details
- Floor count: 30
- Floor area: 37,000 m^{2} (400,000 sq ft)

Design and construction
- Architecture firm: ALA Architects
- Main contractor: NOBE

== Notable alumni ==
- Gerd Kanter - World Champion and Olympics winner at discus throwing
- Kaja Kallas - High Representative of the European Union for Foreign Affairs and Security Policy
- Kaarel Kotkas - Founder of Veriff
- Karoli Hindriks - Founder of Jobbatical
- Kriss Soonik-Käärmann - Founder of Kriss Soonik
- Margus Uudam - Founder at Karma Ventures
- Martin Villig - Co-Founder of Bolt and Elav Tänav
- Tiit Vähi - Former Prime Minister of Estonia

== See also ==
- List of universities in Estonia
