= Tlačnica =

- Location in Slovenia
- Coordinates: 46°9′22″N 14°48′52″E
- Country: Slovenia
- Traditional region: Upper Carniola
- Statistical region: Central Slovenia
- Municipality: Moravče
- Elevation: 703 m (2,306 ft)

Tlačnica (Slovene pronunciation: [ˈtlaːtʃinitsa], in older sources Tlačensa) is a former settlement in the Municipality of Moravče in central Slovenia. It is now part of the village of Peče. The area is part of the traditional region of Upper Carniola. The municipality is now included in the Central Slovenia Statistical Region.

== Geography ==
Tlačnica lies north of the village center of Peče, on a side road from Zgornje Koseze. It is located on the southeastern slope of Big Peak Hill (Slovene: Veliki vrh, elevation: 753 meters or 2,470 feet).

== History ==
Tlačnica had a population of 24 living in four houses in 1880, and 34 living in five houses in 1900. During the Second World War, a Partisan checkpoint operated at the Gašpere farm in Tlačnica. Tlačnica was annexed by Peče in 1952, ending its existence as an independent settlement.
