= Kolavdrija =

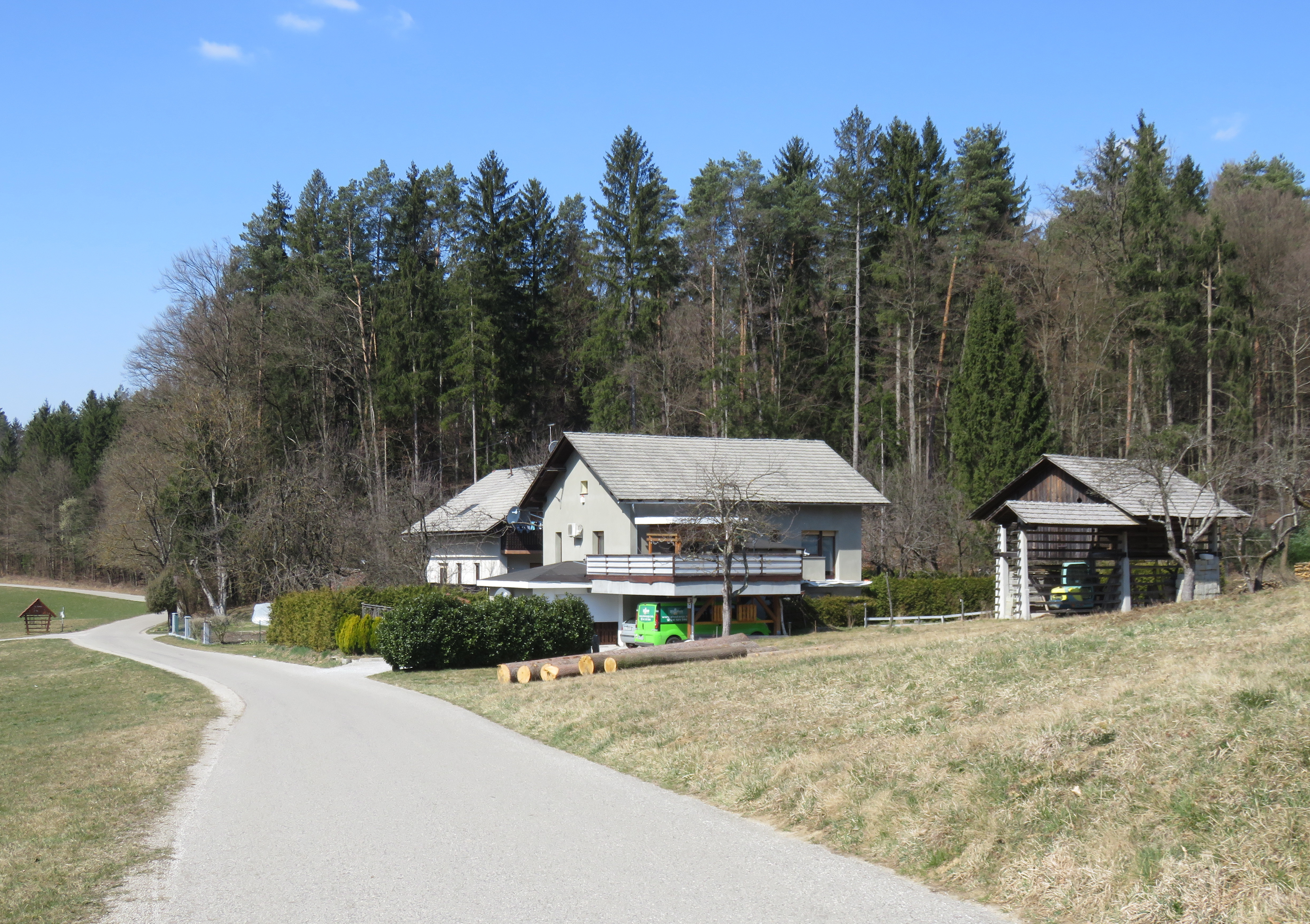

- Location in Slovenia
- Coordinates: 46°7′37″N 14°43′49″E
- Country: Slovenia
- Traditional region: Upper Carniola
- Statistical region: Central Slovenia
- Municipality: Moravče
- Elevation: 358 m (1,175 ft)

Kolavdrija (Slovene pronunciation: [kɔlau̯ˈdɾiːja], also known as Kolavdra vas) is a former settlement in the Municipality of Moravče in central Slovenia. It is now part of the villages of Spodnji Tuštanj and Češnjice pri Moravčah. The area is part of the traditional region of Upper Carniola. The municipality is now included in the Central Slovenia Statistical Region.

== Geography ==
Kolavdrija lies on the border between Spodnji Tuštanj and Češnjice pri Moravčah; the buildings on the west side of the settlement belong to the former, and those on the east side to the latter. Kolavdrija corresponds to the hamlet of Gabrovc.

== History ==
Kolavdrija was annexed by Češnjice pri Moravčah in 1952, ending its existence as an independent settlement.
