= Planjava, Limbarska Gora =

Planjava
- Location in Slovenia
- Coordinates: 46°9′42″N 14°45′49″E
- Country: Slovenia
- Traditional region: Upper Carniola
- Statistical region: Central Slovenia
- Municipality: Moravče
- Elevation: 500 m (1,600 ft)

Planjava (Slovene pronunciation: [plaˈnjaːʋa]) is a former settlement in the Municipality of Moravče in central Slovenia. It is now part of the village of Limbarska Gora. The area is part of the traditional region of Upper Carniola. The municipality is now included in the Central Slovenia Statistical Region.

== Geography ==
Planjava lies on the northwestern edge of the territory of Limbarska Gora, on the slope of the hill ascending to the main settlement. It is accessible by a side road from Negastrn.

== History ==
Planjava had a population of five living in one house in 1900. Planjava was annexed by Limbarska Gora (at that time still called Sveti Valentin) in 1952, ending its existence as an independent settlement.
