= Sveti Andrej, Moravče =

Sveti Andrej
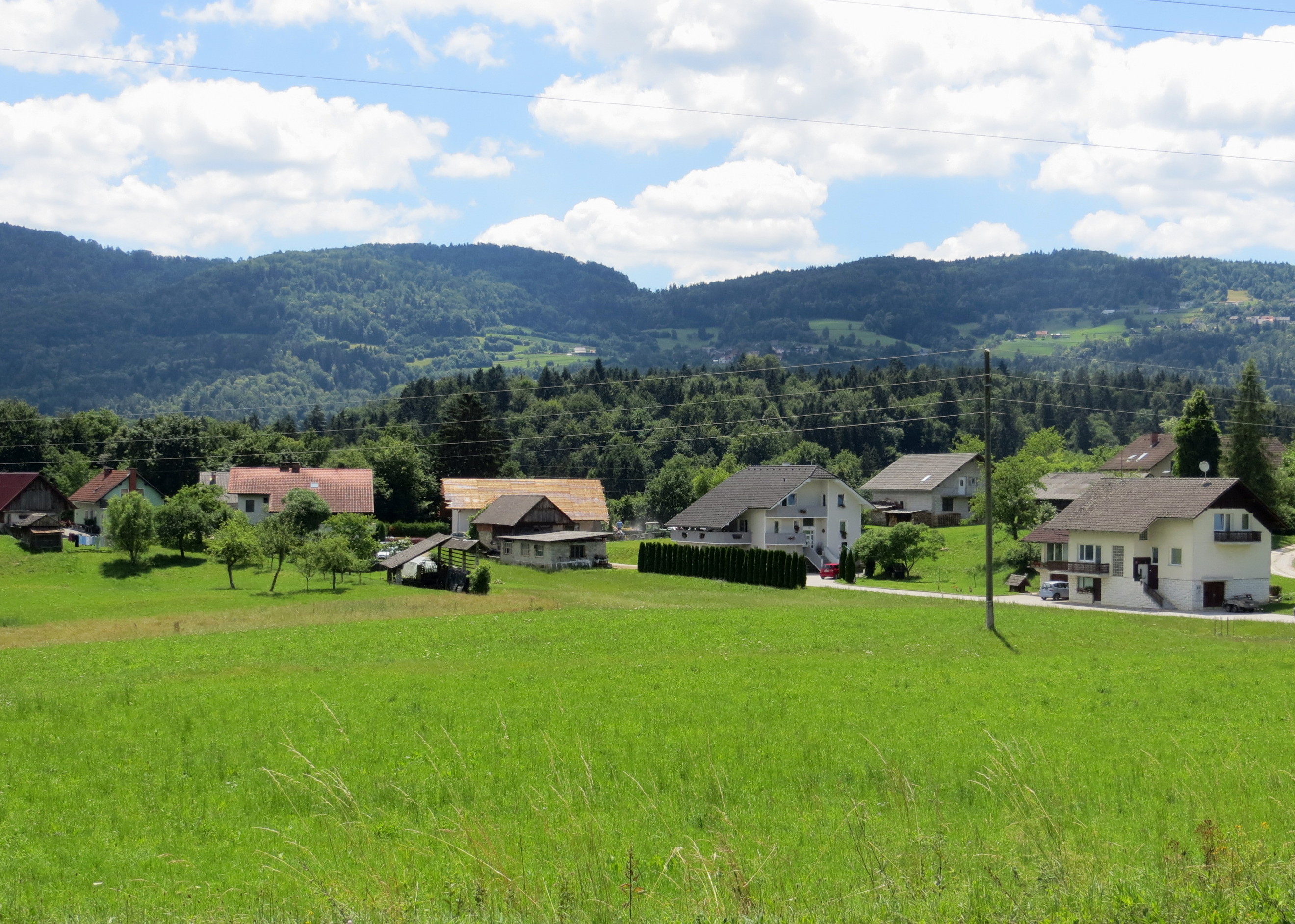

- Location in Slovenia
- Coordinates: 46°8′17.49″N 14°42′30.45″E
- Country: Slovenia
- Traditional region: Upper Carniola
- Statistical region: Central Slovenia
- Municipality: Moravče

Area
  - Total: 0.16 km^{2} (0.062 sq mi)
- Elevation: 348.4 m (1,143 ft)

Population (2002)
  - Total: 51
- Postal code: 1251

Sveti Andrej (pronounced [ˈsʋeːti anˈdɾeːi̯]; German: Sankt Andrä) is a small settlement in the Municipality of Moravče in central Slovenia. The area is part of the traditional region of Upper Carniola. It is now included with the rest of the municipality in the Central Slovenia Statistical Region.

== History ==
Sveti Andrej was merged with Dole pri Krašcah in 1955. It was separated again from Dole pri Krašcah in 1992.

== Church ==
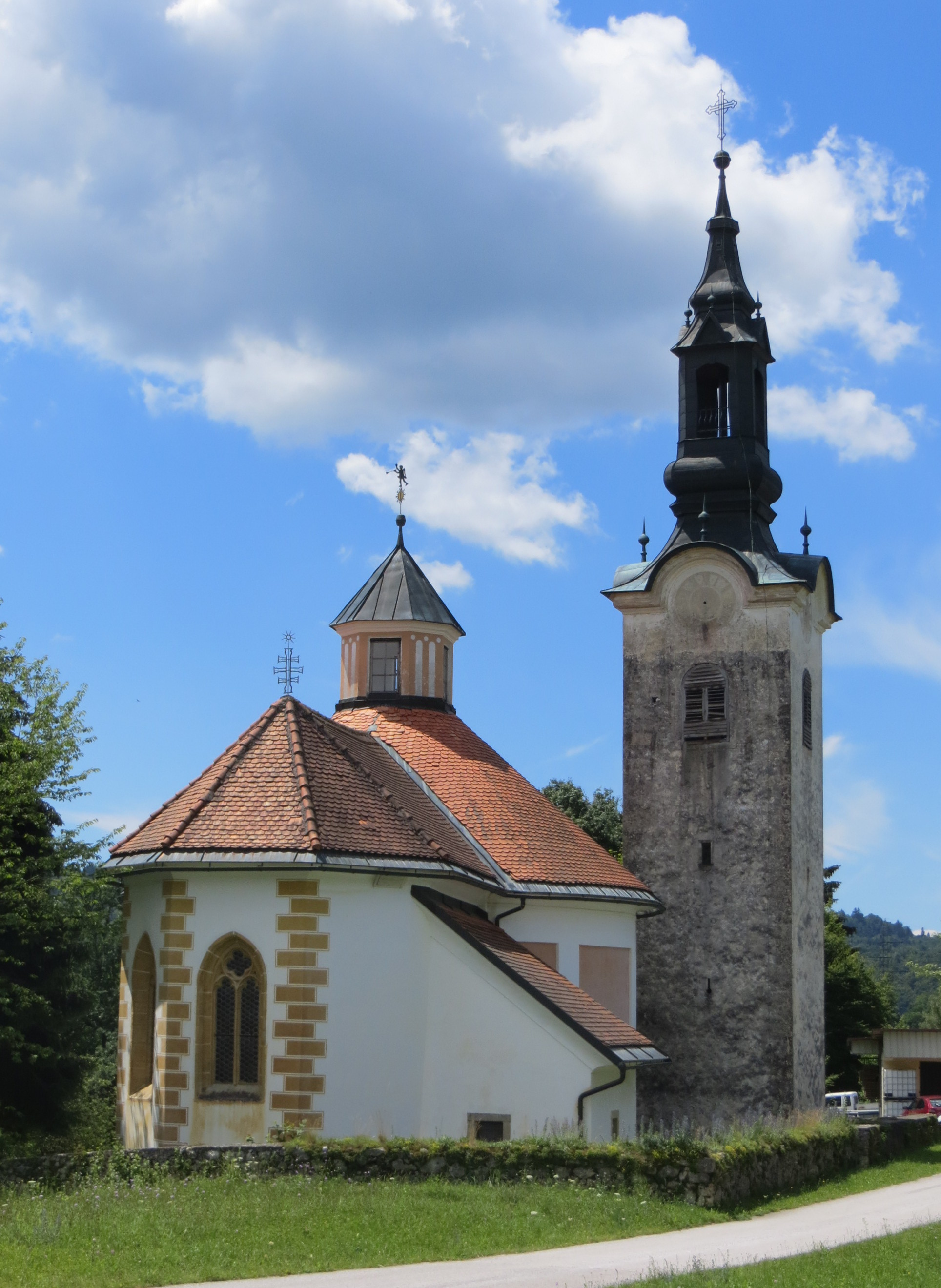
Saint Andrew's Church

The local church, after which the settlement is named, is dedicated to Saint Andrew. It belongs to the Parish of Moravče. Its oldest parts date to the 15th century, but it was extended and rebuilt in the 16th and 18th centuries.
