= Prikrnica =

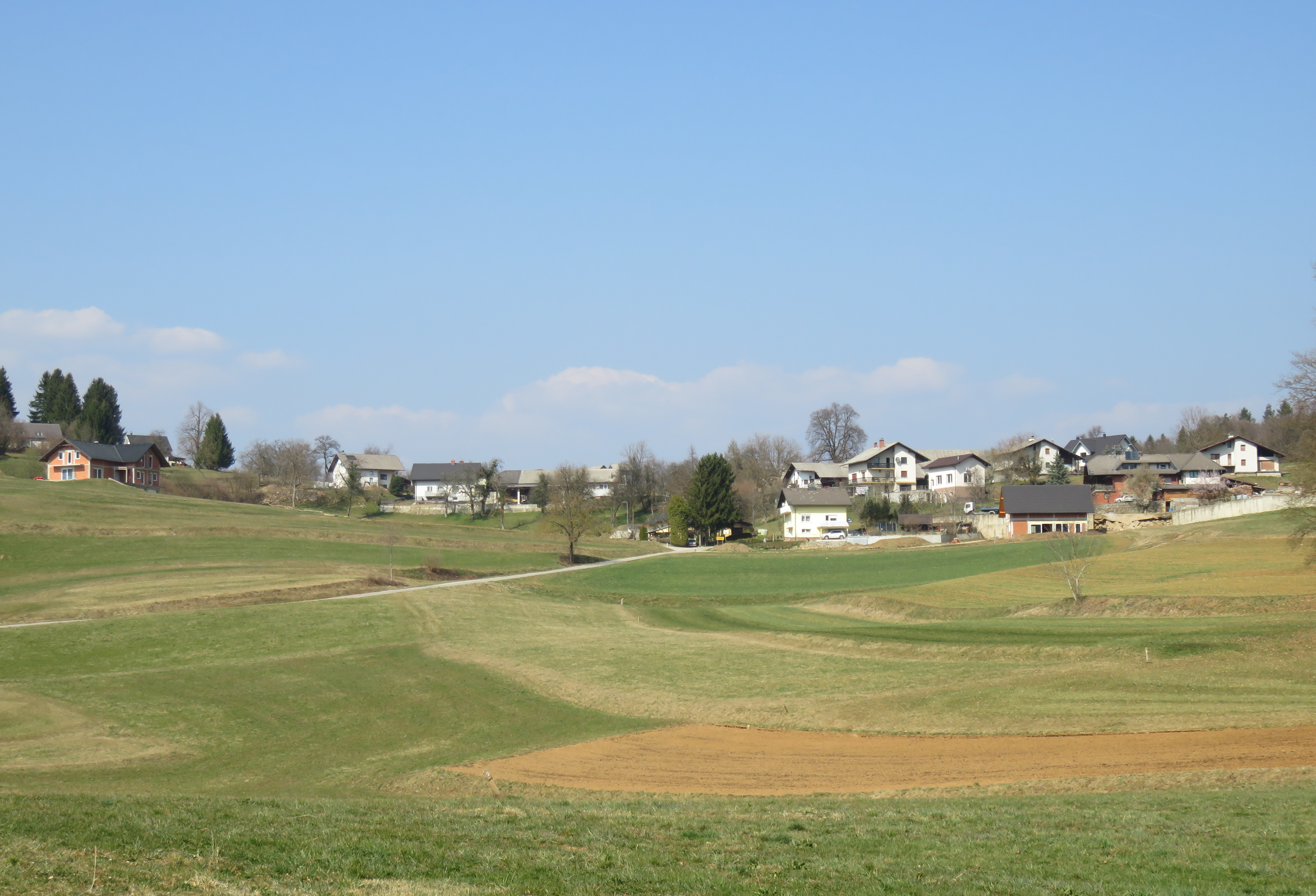

- Location in Slovenia
- Coordinates: 46°8′49.01″N 14°43′10.13″E
- Country: Slovenia
- Traditional region: Upper Carniola
- Statistical region: Central Slovenia
- Municipality: Moravče

Area
  - Total: 1.43 km^{2} (0.55 sq mi)
- Elevation: 424.7 m (1,393 ft)

Population (2002)
  - Total: 60
- Postal code: 1251

Prikrnica (pronounced [ˈpɾiːkəɾnitsa]) is a small village north of Dole pri Krašcah in the Municipality of Moravče in central Slovenia. The area is part of the traditional region of Upper Carniola. It is now included with the rest of the municipality in the Central Slovenia Statistical Region.

== Name ==
Prikrnica was attested in historical sources as Prikernicz in 1391, and as Prikarnitz and Prykarnicz in 1429, among other spellings.
