= Krašce =

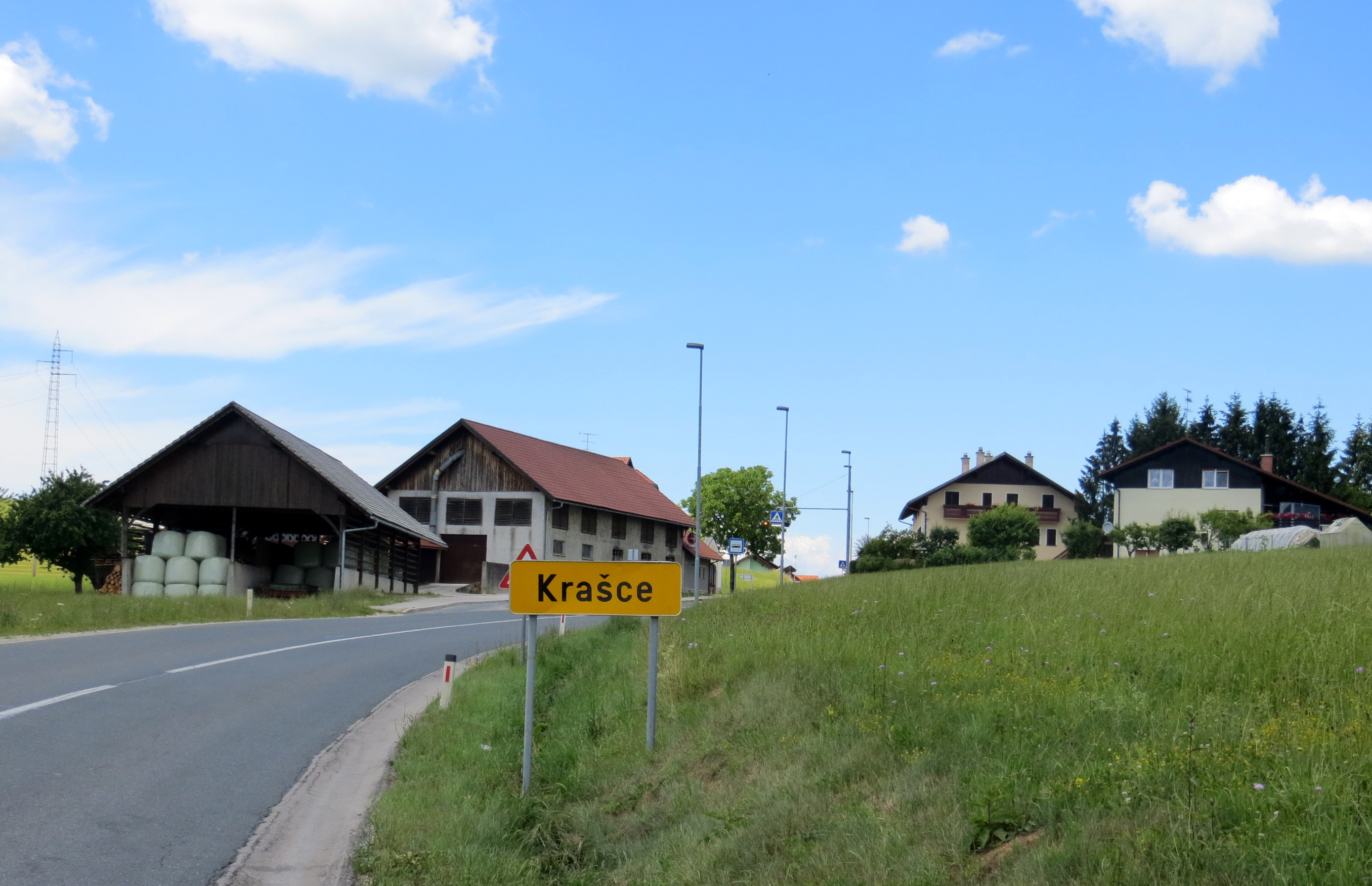

- Location in Slovenia
- Coordinates: 46°8′7.21″N 14°43′3.35″E
- Country: Slovenia
- Traditional region: Upper Carniola
- Statistical region: Central Slovenia
- Municipality: Moravče

Area
  - Total: 0.44 km^{2} (0.17 sq mi)
- Elevation: 362.3 m (1,189 ft)

Population (2002)
  - Total: 120
- Postal code: 1251

Krašce (pronounced [ˈkɾaːʃtsɛ]; in older sources also Krašice, German: Kraschze) is a small settlement in the Municipality of Moravče in central Slovenia. It lies on the main road west of Moravče. The area is part of the traditional region of Upper Carniola. It is now included with the rest of the municipality in the Central Slovenia Statistical Region.

== Name ==
Krašce was attested in historical sources as Grastich in 1304, Craecz in 1345, Chrasticz in 1431, and Krast in 1426, among other spellings.
