= Križate =

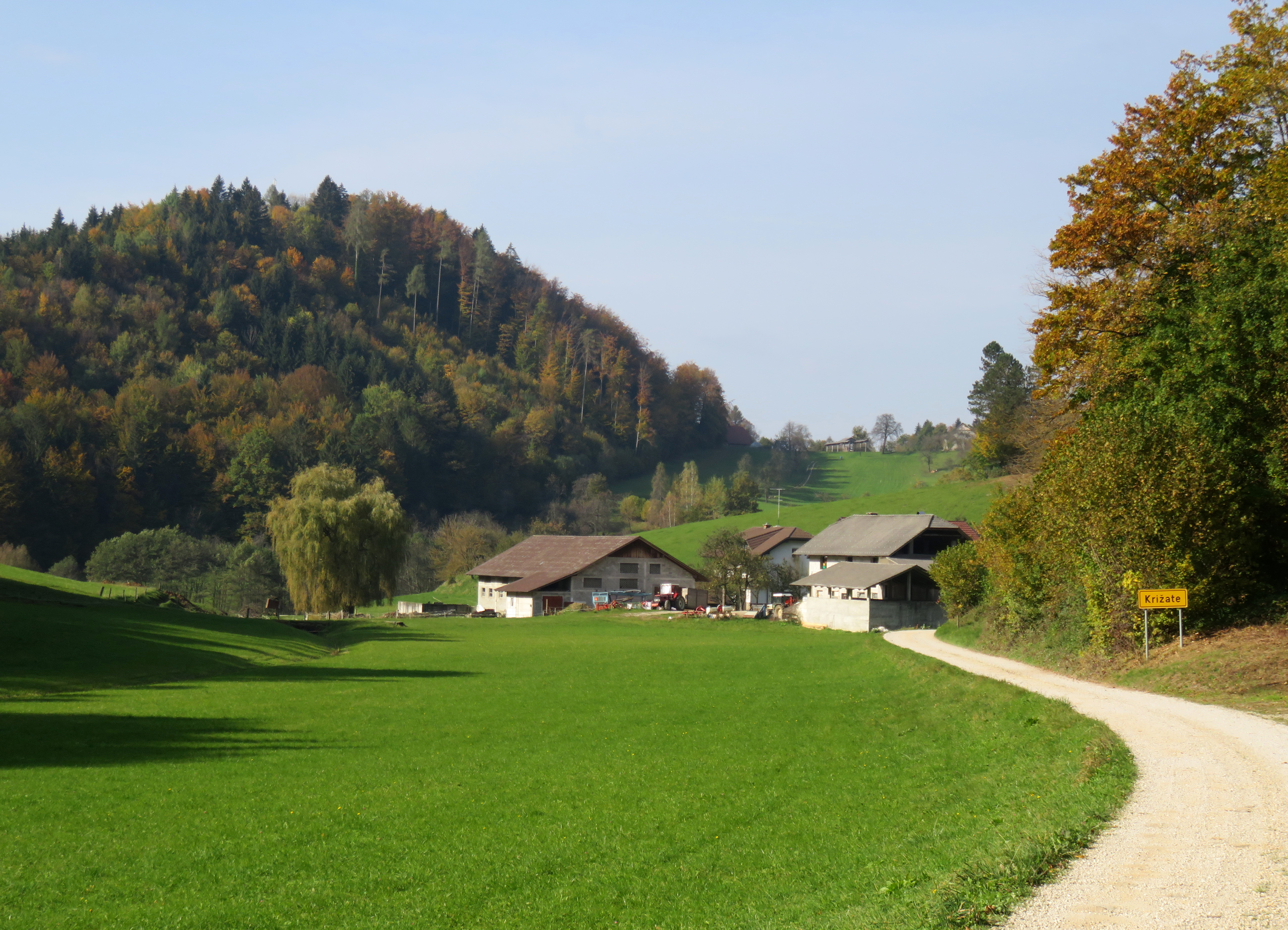

- Location in Slovenia
- Coordinates: 46°8′39.76″N 14°49′53.26″E
- Country: Slovenia
- Traditional region: Upper Carniola
- Statistical region: Central Slovenia
- Municipality: Moravče

Area
  - Total: 1.21 km^{2} (0.47 sq mi)
- Elevation: 453 m (1,486 ft)

Population (2002)
  - Total: 31
- Postal code: 1251

Križate (pronounced [kɾiˈʒaːtɛ]) is a settlement east of Peče in the Municipality of Moravče in central Slovenia. The area is part of the traditional region of Upper Carniola. It is now included with the rest of the municipality in the Central Slovenia Statistical Region.

== Name ==
Križate was attested in historical sources as Krisacz in 1420, Krisant in 1430, and Krysat in 1436.

== Church ==
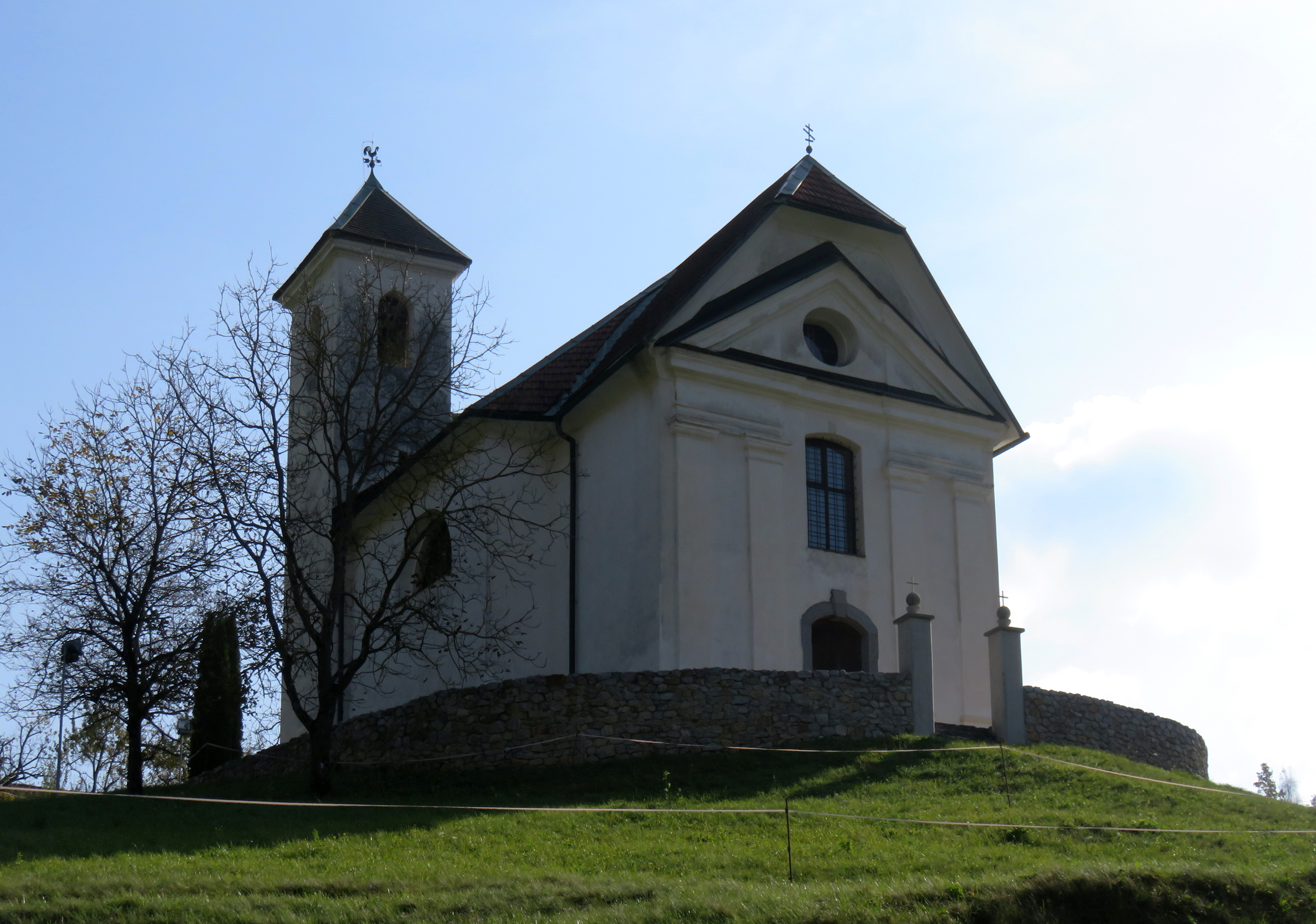
Archangel Michael Church

The local church is dedicated to Archangel Michael and belongs to the Parish of Peče. It was a Gothic building that was largely rebuilt in the 18th century with only the sanctuary and the lower level of the belfry preserved from the original church.
