= Gorica, Moravče =

Gorica
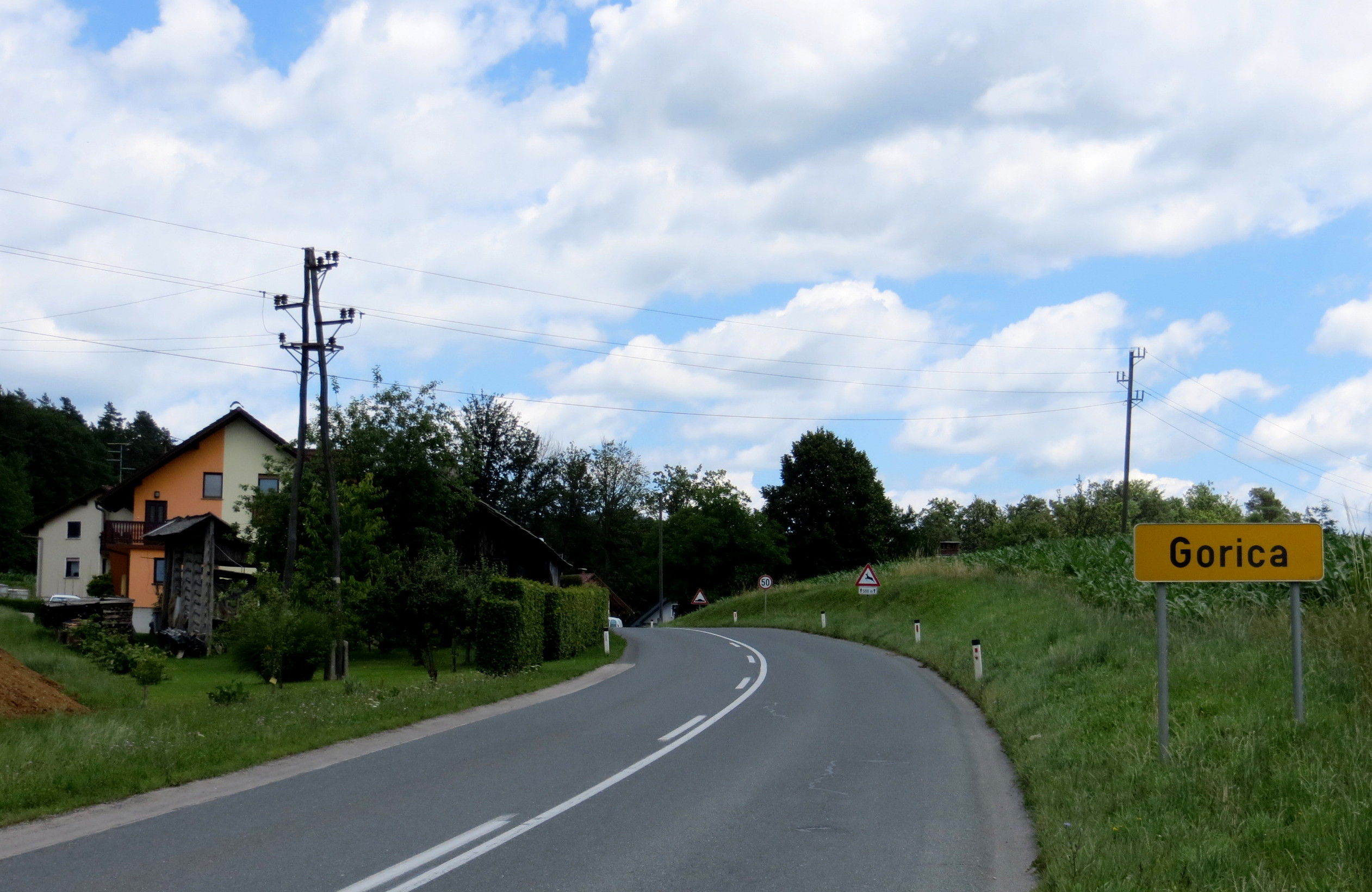

- Location in Slovenia
- Coordinates: 46°8′12.45″N 14°43′28.02″E
- Country: Slovenia
- Traditional region: Upper Carniola
- Statistical region: Central Slovenia
- Municipality: Moravče

Area
  - Total: 0.42 km^{2} (0.16 sq mi)
- Elevation: 359.9 m (1,181 ft)

Population (2002)
  - Total: 126
- Postal code: 1251

Gorica (pronounced [ɡɔˈɾiːtsa]; German: Goritz) is a settlement immediately to the west of Moravče in central Slovenia. The area is part of the traditional region of Upper Carniola. It is now included with the rest of the Municipality of Moravče in the Central Slovenia Statistical Region.

== Name ==
Gorica was attested in historical sources as Goriczen in 1358 and Puͤhel in 1458.
