= Spodnja Javoršica =

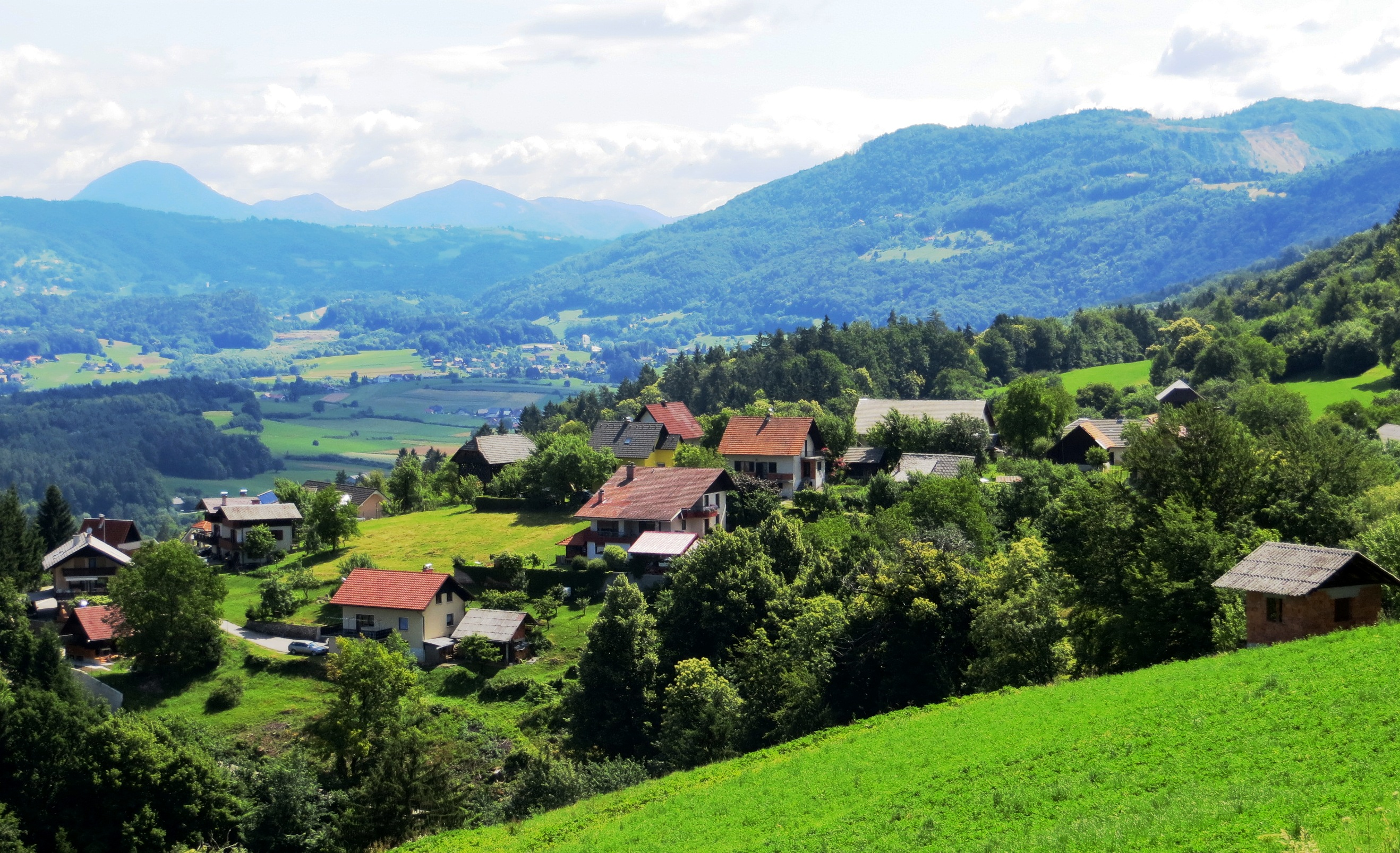

- Location in Slovenia
- Coordinates: 46°7′8.17″N 14°42′29.18″E
- Country: Slovenia
- Traditional region: Upper Carniola
- Statistical region: Central Slovenia
- Municipality: Moravče

Area
  - Total: 1.24 km^{2} (0.48 sq mi)
- Elevation: 517 m (1,696 ft)

Population (2002)
  - Total: 62
- Postal code: 1251

Spodnja Javoršica (pronounced [ˈspoːdnja ˈjaːʋɔɾʃitsa]; German: Unterjaworschitz) is a small settlement south of Vrhpolje in the Municipality of Moravče in central Slovenia. The area is part of the traditional region of Upper Carniola. It is now included with the rest of the municipality in the Central Slovenia Statistical Region.
