= Dole pod Sveto Trojico =

Dole pod Sveto Trojico Dole pod Trojico (1955–1992)
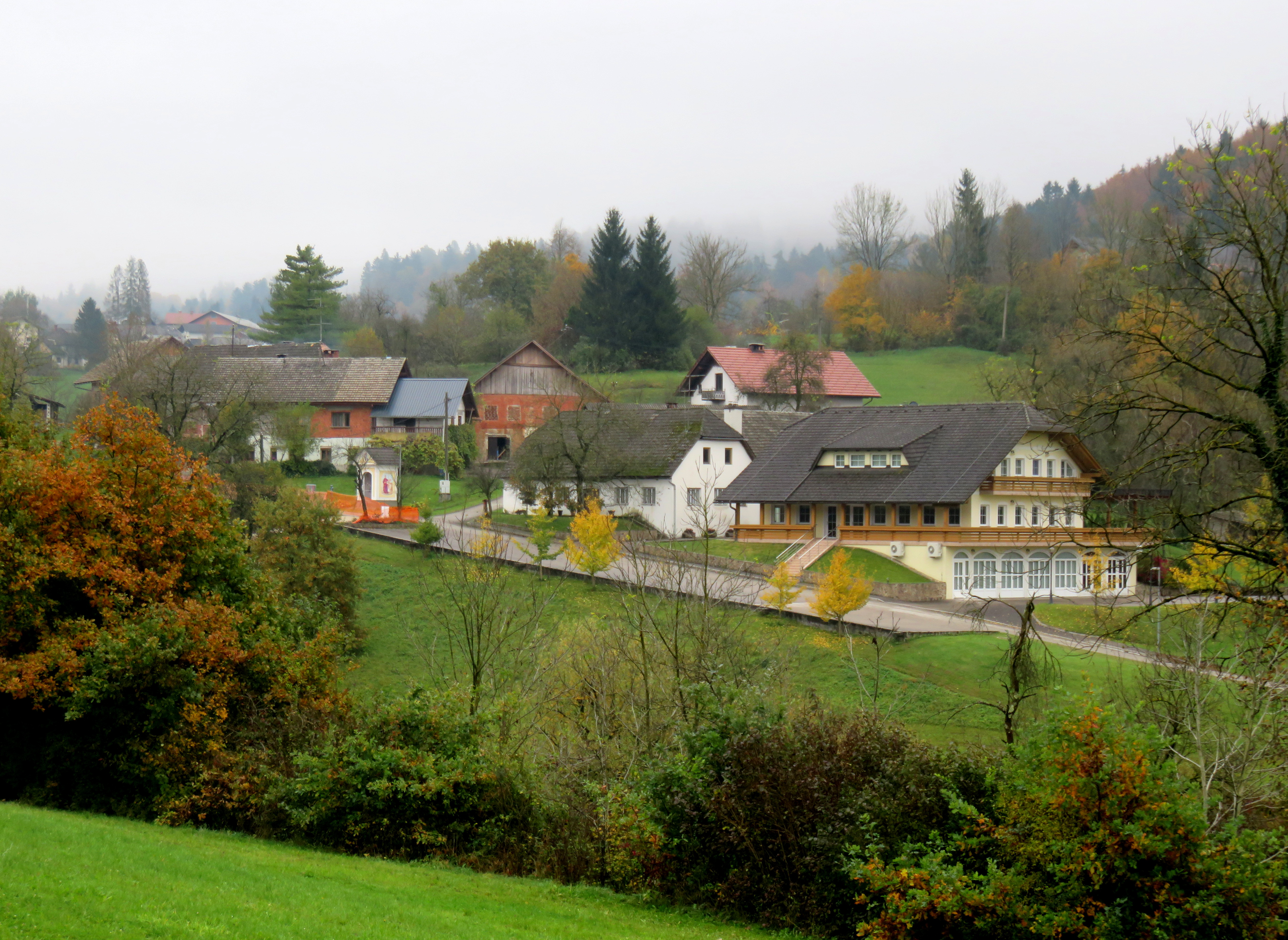

- Location in Slovenia
- Coordinates: 46°7′56.94″N 14°41′33.48″E
- Country: Slovenia
- Traditional region: Upper Carniola
- Statistical region: Central Slovenia
- Municipality: Moravče

Area
  - Total: 0.21 km^{2} (0.081 sq mi)
- Elevation: 327.1 m (1,073 ft)

Population (2002)
  - Total: 14
- Postal code: 1251

Dole pod Sveto Trojico (pronounced [ˈdoːlɛ pɔt ˈsʋeːtɔ tɾɔˈjiːtsɔ]) is a small settlement in the Municipality of Moravče in central Slovenia. The area is part of the traditional region of Upper Carniola. It is now included with the rest of the municipality in the Central Slovenia Statistical Region.

== Name ==
The name of the settlement was changed from Dole pod Sveto Trojico (literally, 'Dole below the Holy Trinity') to Dole pod Trojico (literally, 'Dole below Trinity') in 1955. The name was changed on the basis of the 1948 Law on Names of Settlements and Designations of Squares, Streets, and Buildings as part of efforts by Slovenia's postwar communist government to remove religious elements from toponyms. The name Dole pod Sveto Trojico was restored in 1992.

== Cultural heritage ==
A small chapel-shrine in the settlement was erected in 1897 and renovated in 2001.
