= Goričica pri Moravčah =

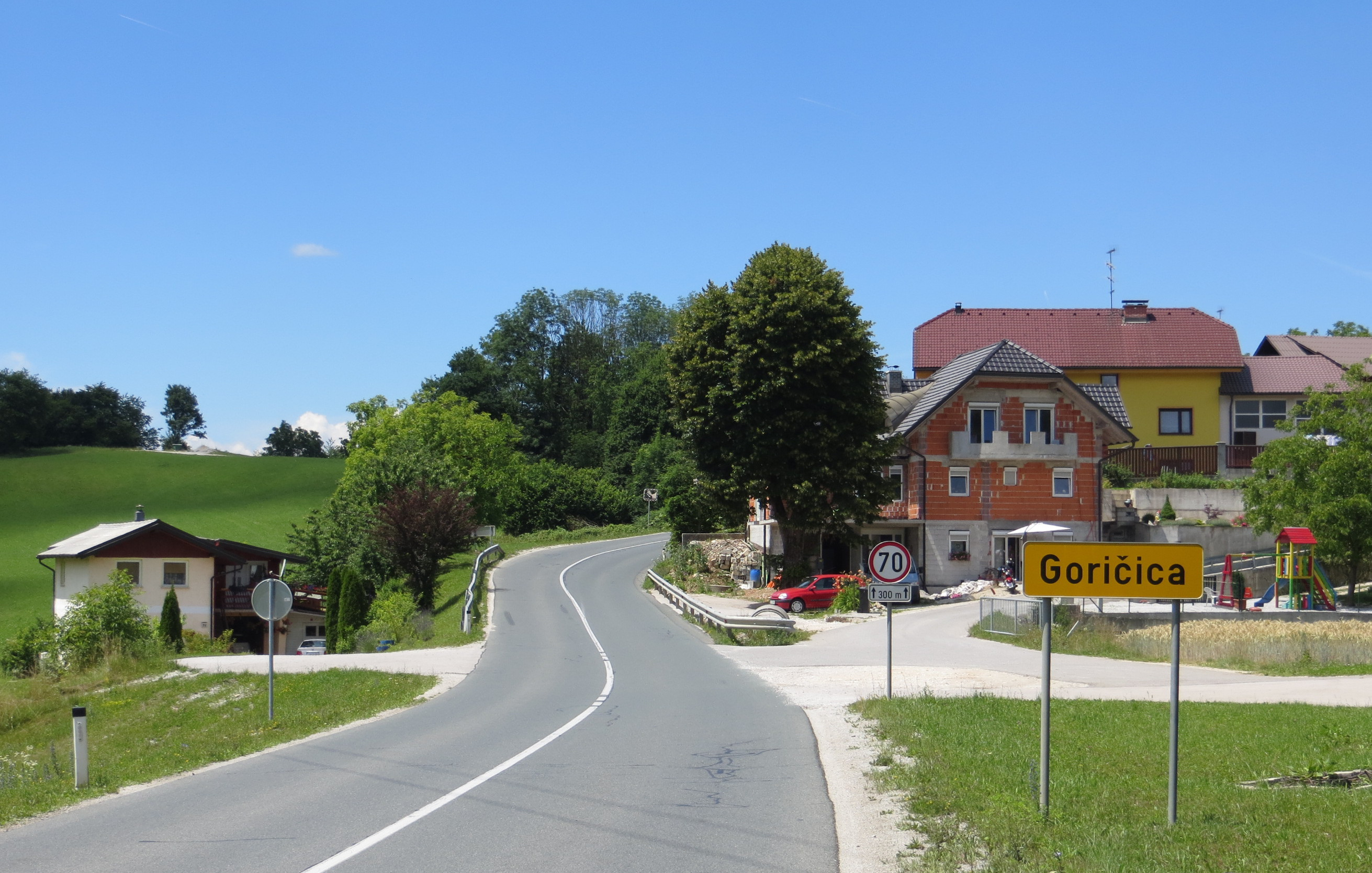

- Location in Slovenia
- Coordinates: 46°8′12.73″N 14°41′4.51″E
- Country: Slovenia
- Traditional region: Upper Carniola
- Statistical region: Central Slovenia
- Municipality: Moravče

Area
  - Total: 0.59 km^{2} (0.23 sq mi)
- Elevation: 322.3 m (1,057 ft)

Population (2002)
  - Total: 76
- Postal code: 1251

Goričica pri Moravčah (pronounced [ɡɔˈɾiːtʃitsa pɾi mɔˈɾaːu̯tʃax]) is a settlement in the Municipality of Moravče in central Slovenia. The area is part of the traditional region of Upper Carniola region. It is now included with the rest of the municipality in the Central Slovenia Statistical Region.

== Name ==
The name of the settlement was changed from Goričica to Goričica pri Moravčah in 1955.
