= Gabrje pod Limbarsko Goro =

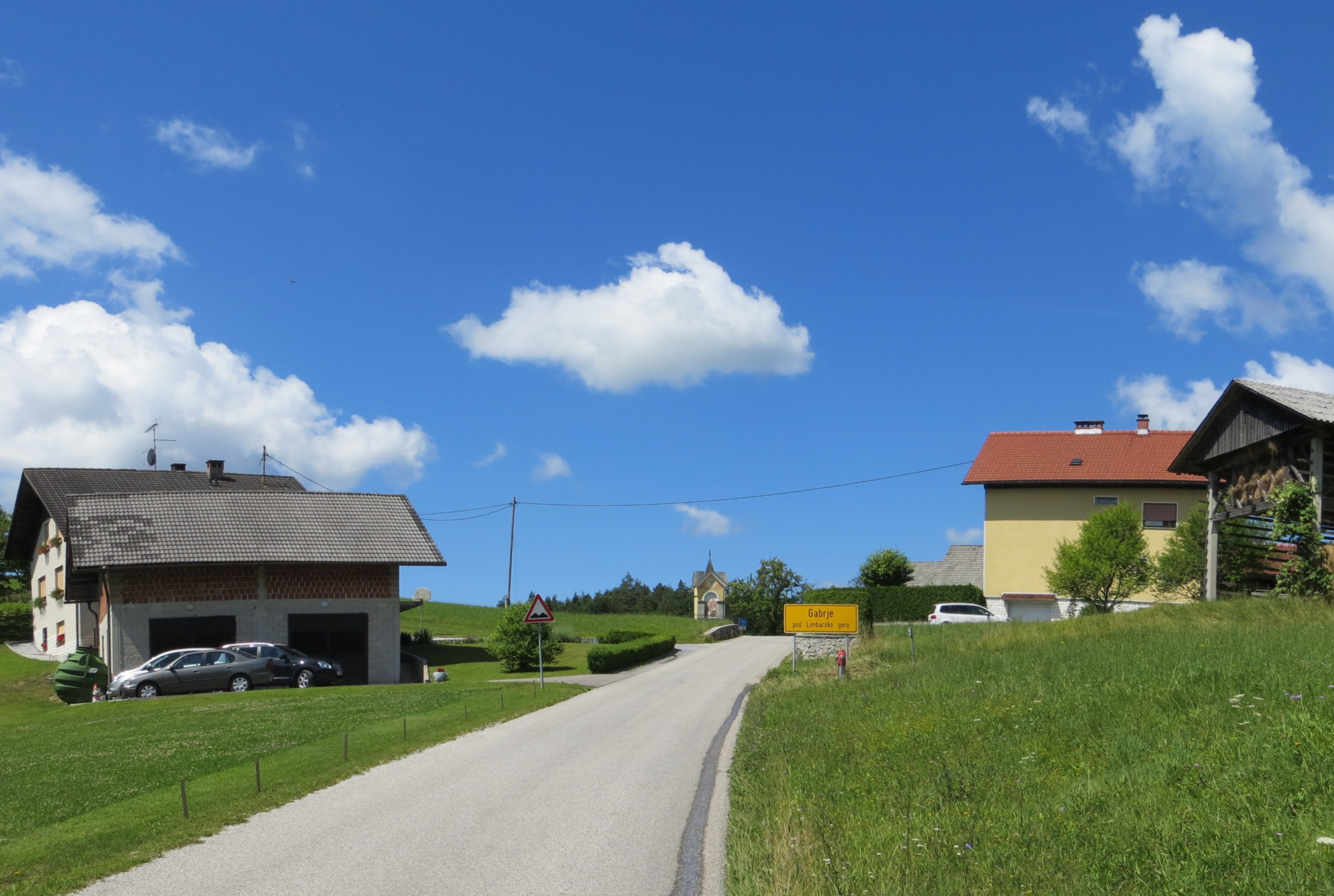

- Location in Slovenia
- Coordinates: 46°8′52.03″N 14°46′22.58″E
- Country: Slovenia
- Traditional region: Upper Carniola
- Statistical region: Central Slovenia
- Municipality: Moravče

Area
  - Total: 0.58 km^{2} (0.22 sq mi)
- Elevation: 437.2 m (1,434 ft)

Population (2002)
  - Total: 50
- Postal code: 1251

Gabrje pod Limbarsko Goro (pronounced [ˈɡaːbəɾjɛ pɔt ˈliːmbaɾskɔ ˈɡɔːɾɔ]) is a settlement northeast of Moravče in central Slovenia. The area is part of the traditional region of Upper Carniola. It is now included with the rest of the Municipality of Moravče in the Central Slovenia Statistical Region.

== Name ==
The name of the settlement was changed from Gabrje to Gabrje pod Limbarsko Goro in 1955.
