= Soteska pri Moravčah =

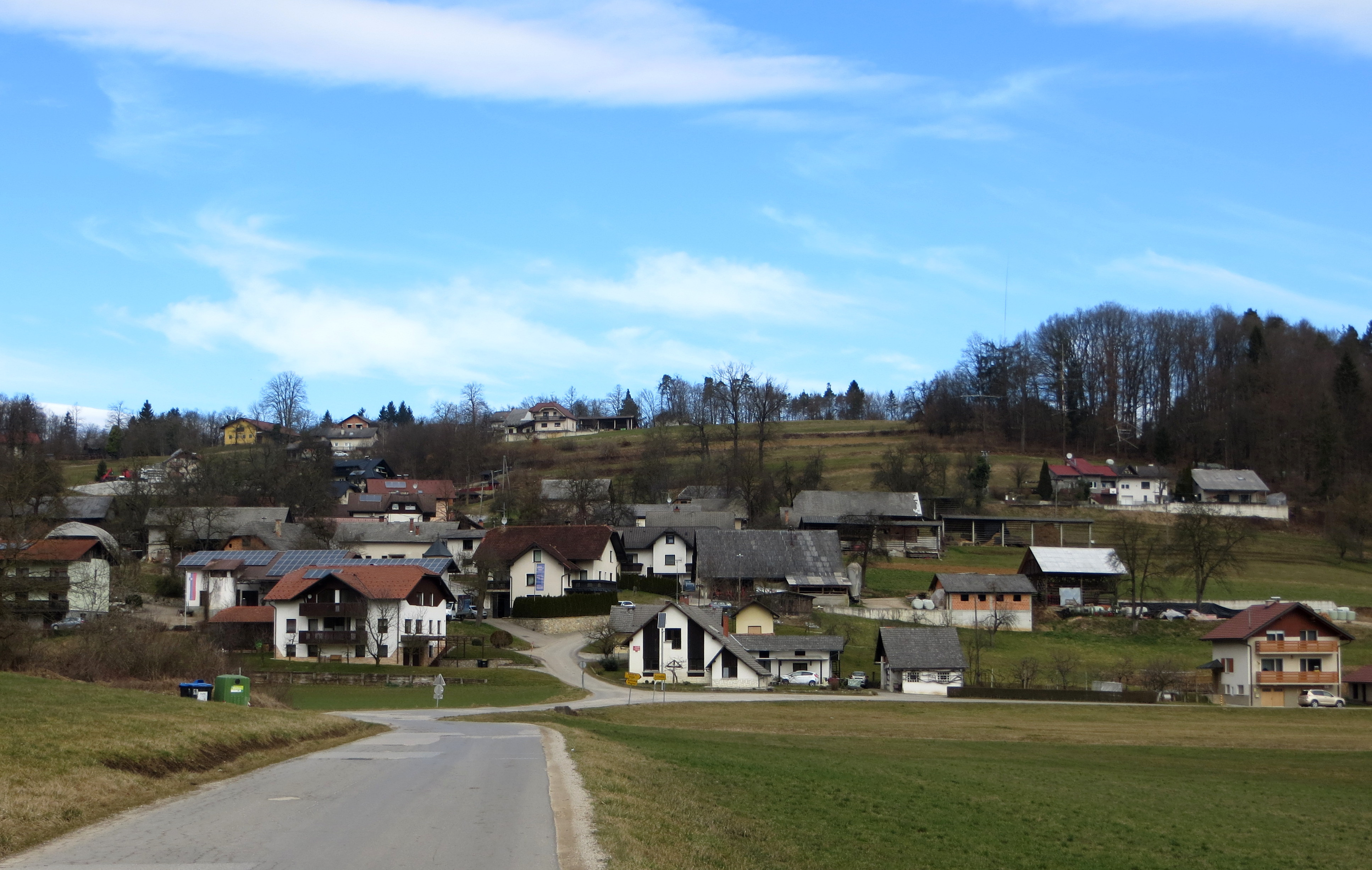

- Location in Slovenia
- Coordinates: 46°8′43.73″N 14°44′48.02″E
- Country: Slovenia
- Traditional region: Upper Carniola
- Statistical region: Central Slovenia
- Municipality: Moravče

Area
  - Total: 0.76 km^{2} (0.29 sq mi)
- Elevation: 369.7 m (1,213 ft)

Population (2002)
  - Total: 87
- Postal code: 1251

Soteska pri Moravčah (pronounced [sɔˈteːska pɾi mɔˈɾaːu̯tʃax]) is a settlement north of Moravče in central Slovenia. The area is part of the traditional region of Upper Carniola. It is now included with the rest of the municipality in the Central Slovenia Statistical Region.

== Name ==
Soteska pri Moravčah was attested in historical sources as Sotosk in 1328, Zotesk in 1332, Sotesken in 1341, and Satteskch in 1405, among other spellings. The name of the settlement was changed from Soteska to Soteska pri Moravčah in 1953.
