= Serjuče =

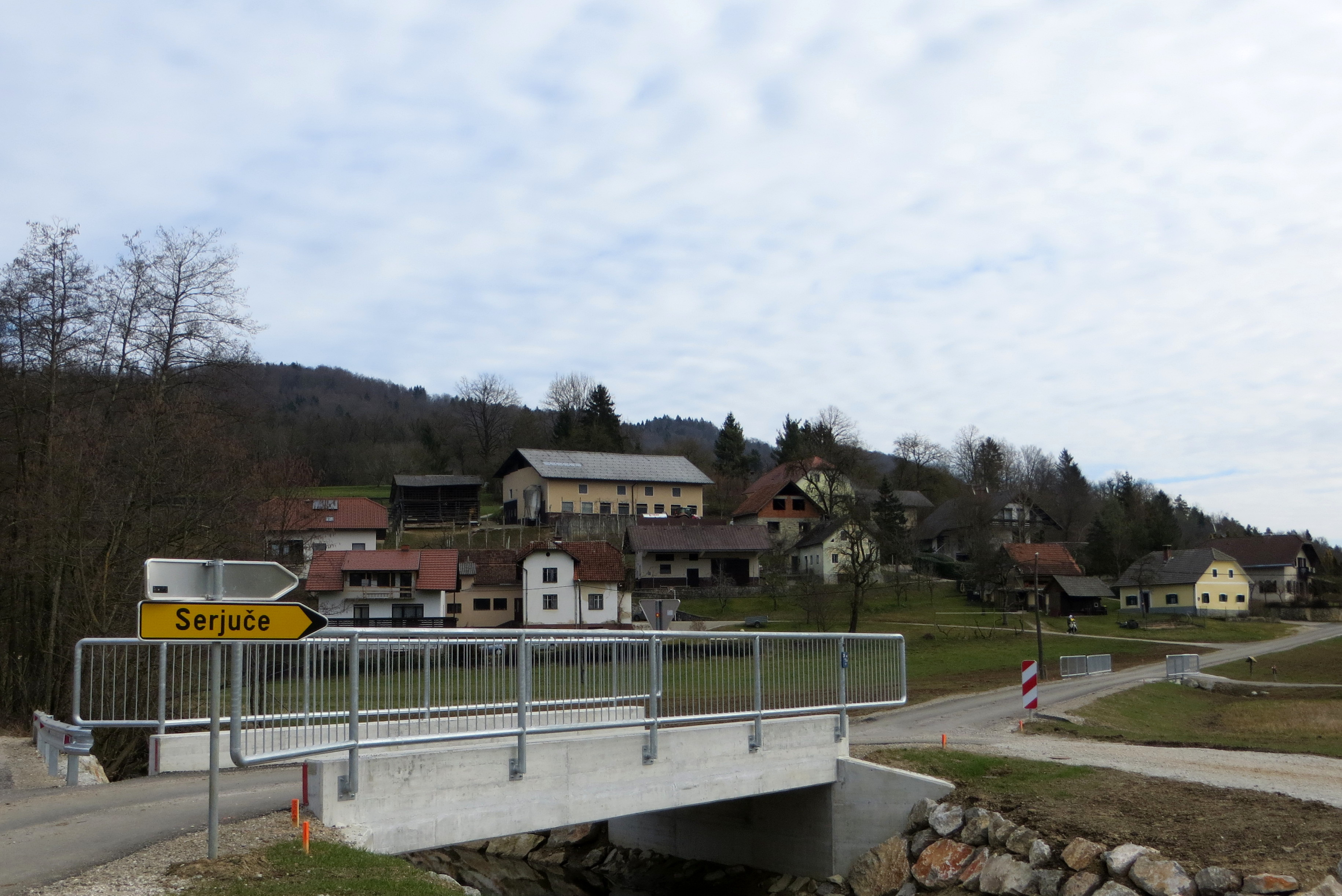

- Location in Slovenia
- Coordinates: 46°8′50.57″N 14°45′5.23″E
- Country: Slovenia
- Traditional region: Upper Carniola
- Statistical region: Central Slovenia
- Municipality: Moravče

Area
  - Total: 0.76 km^{2} (0.29 sq mi)
- Elevation: 400.2 m (1,313 ft)

Population (2002)
  - Total: 58
- Postal code: 1251

Serjuče (pronounced [sɛˈɾjuːtʃɛ]) is a small settlement north of Moravče in central Slovenia. The area is part of the traditional region of Upper Carniola. It is now included with the rest of the Municipality of Moravče in the Central Slovenia Statistical Region.
