= Straža pri Moravčah =

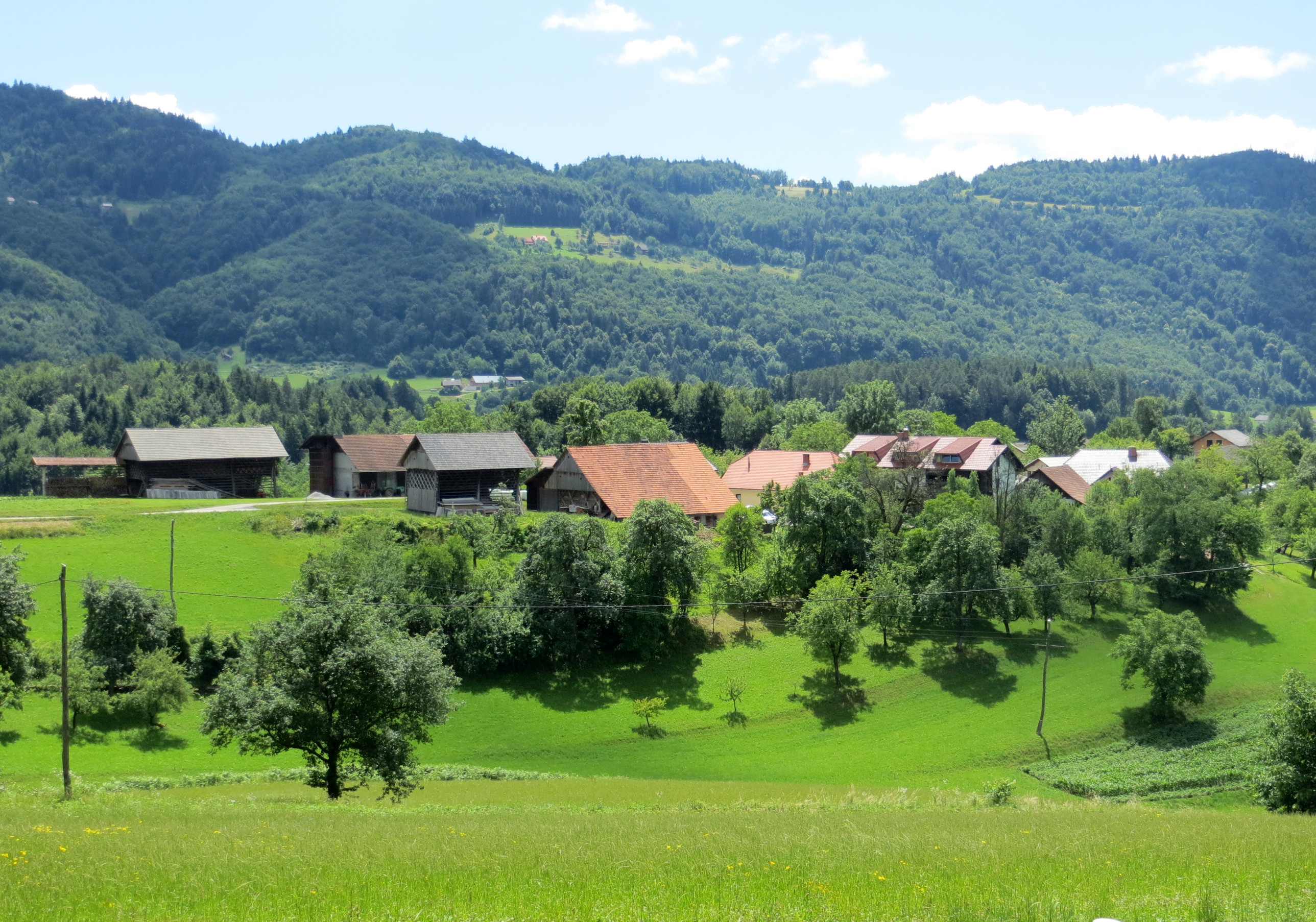

- Location in Slovenia
- Coordinates: 46°8′18.6″N 14°45′51.5″E
- Country: Slovenia
- Traditional region: Upper Carniola
- Statistical region: Central Slovenia
- Municipality: Moravče

Area
  - Total: 0.43 km^{2} (0.17 sq mi)
- Elevation: 418.1 m (1,372 ft)

Population (2002)
  - Total: 38
- Postal code: 1251

Straža pri Moravčah (pronounced [ˈstɾaːʒa pɾi mɔˈɾaːu̯tʃax]) is a small settlement east of Moravče in central Slovenia. The area is part of the traditional region of Upper Carniola. It is now included with the rest of the Municipality of Moravče in the Central Slovenia Statistical Region.

== Name ==
Straža pri Moravčah was attested in historical sources as Wart in 1361. Historically, it was simply known as Straža, and the name was lengthened to Straža pri Moravčah (literally, 'Straža near Moravče') in 1985.

== History ==
Straža pri Moravčah had a population of 40 living in eight houses in 1900. Straža pri Moravčah was annexed by Drtija in 1952, ending its existence as an independent settlement. The settlement was separated again from Drtija in 1985.
