= Zgornji Tuštanj =

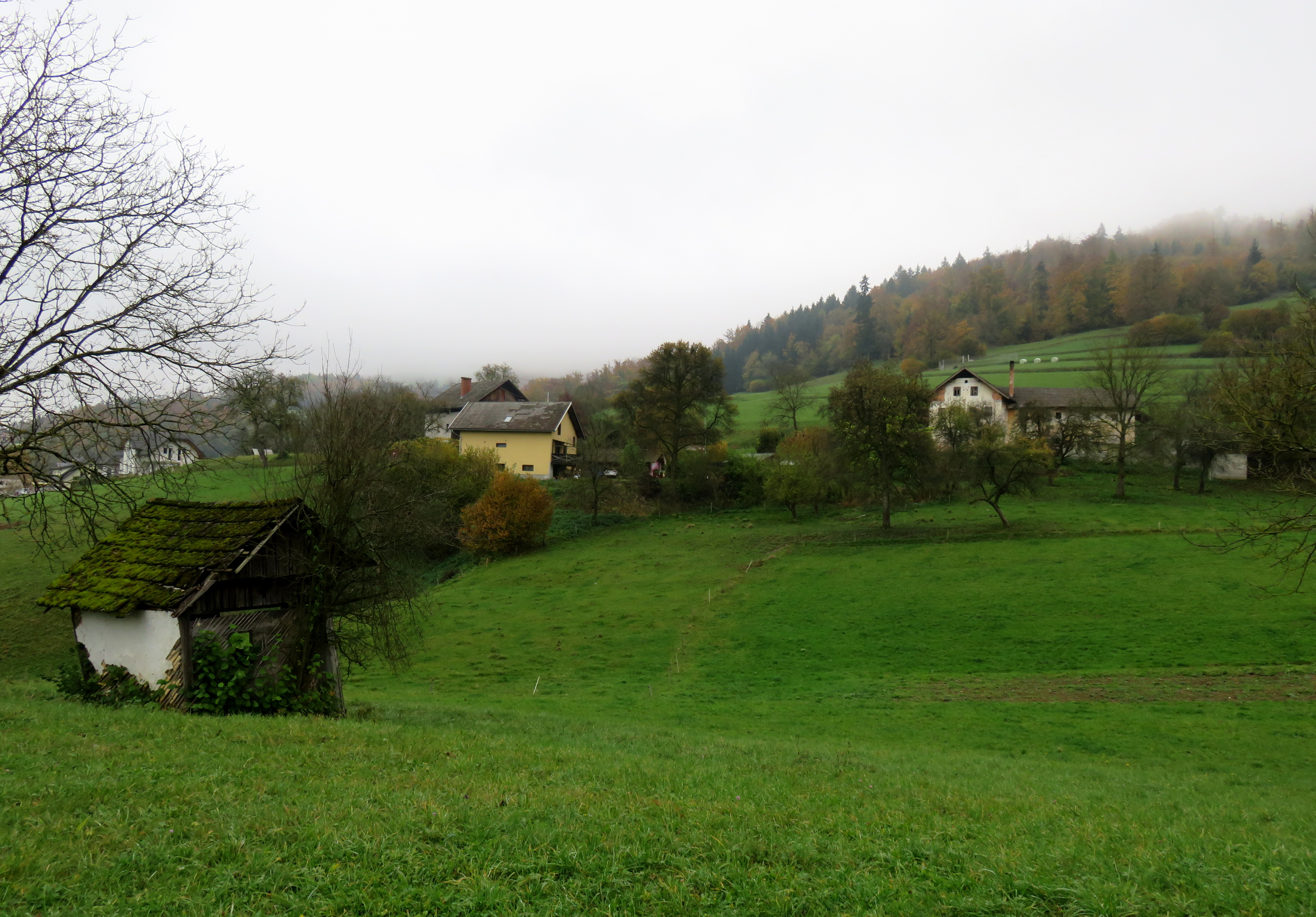

- Location in Slovenia
- Coordinates: 46°7′24.86″N 14°43′38.5″E
- Country: Slovenia
- Traditional region: Upper Carniola
- Statistical region: Central Slovenia
- Municipality: Moravče

Area
  - Total: 1.74 km^{2} (0.67 sq mi)
- Elevation: 388.3 m (1,274 ft)

Population (2002)
  - Total: 45
- Postal code: 1251

Zgornji Tuštanj (pronounced [ˈzɡoːɾnji ˈtuːʃtan]; German: Obertufstein) is a settlement in the Municipality of Moravče in central Slovenia. The area is part of the traditional region of Upper Carniola. It is now included with the rest of the municipality in the Central Slovenia Statistical Region.

== Name ==
Zgornji Tuštanj was attested in historical sources as Tuftstein in 1260, Taustayn in 1335, Tenztain in 1494, and Twfcstain in 1496, among other spellings.

== Tuštanj Castle ==
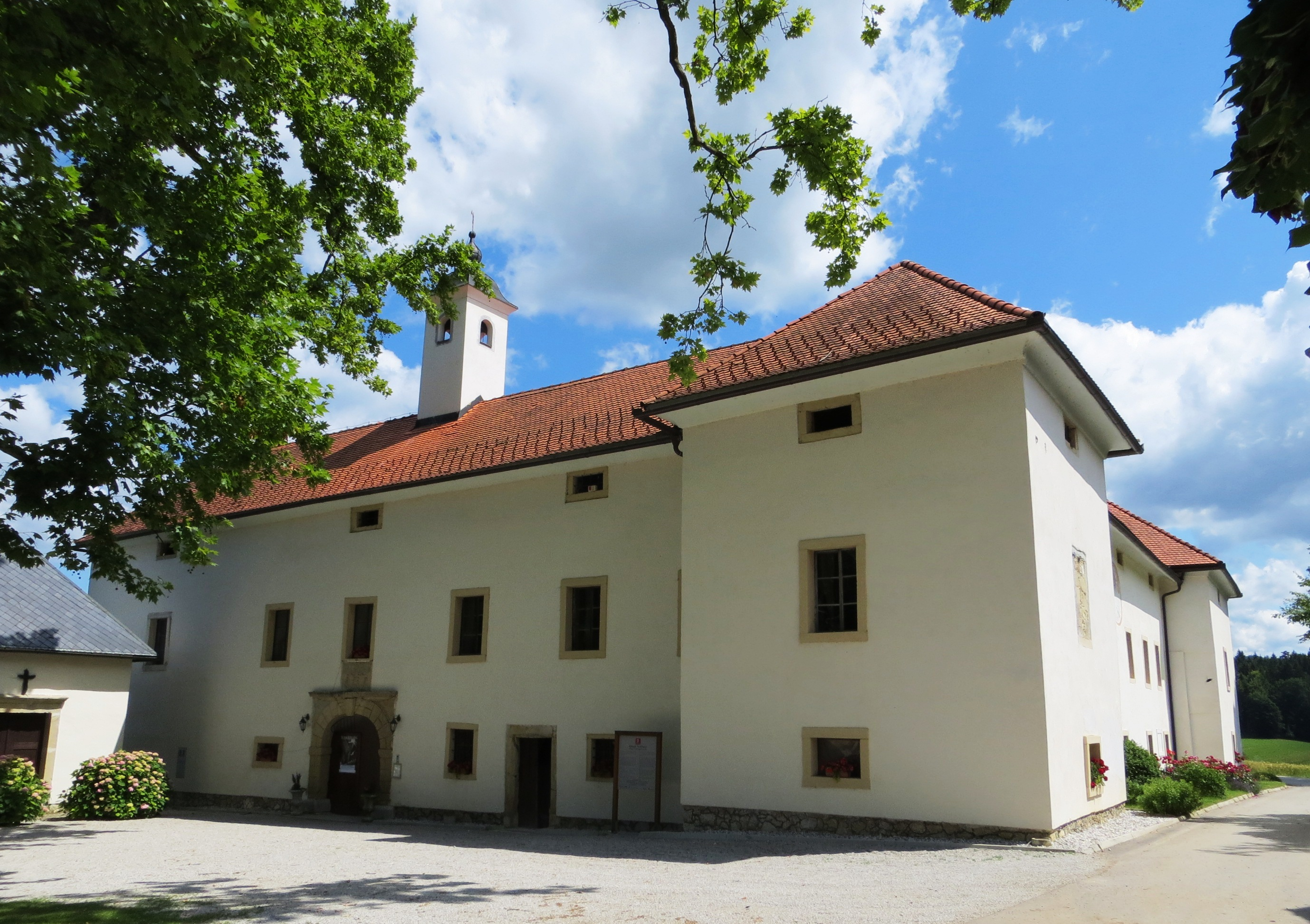
West view

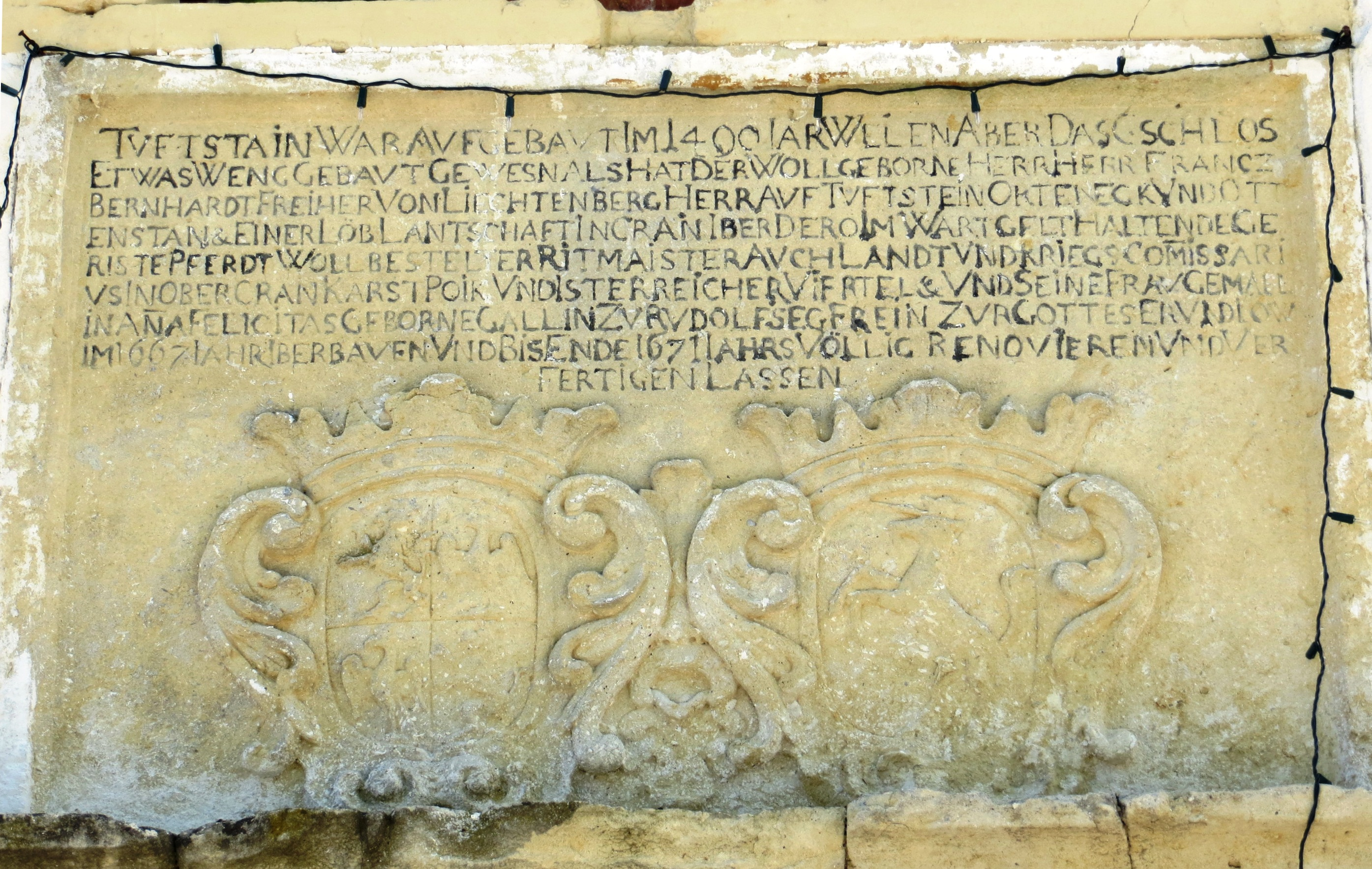
Plaque

Tuštanj Castle

Tuštanj Castle (German: Tuffstein) is a castle in the settlement. It stands on a hill southwest of Moravče and southeast of the road to Vrhpolje. It was built in 1490, and the restyled as a Renaissance mansion between 1667 and 1671. It has an arcaded courtyard, a door casing with a heraldic plaque, and vintage furnishings. There is a chapel next to the castle dating from 1704 with Baroque paintings. The castle park preserves a pond and a large plane tree.

== Notable people ==
Notable people that were born or lived in Zgornji Tuštanj include:

- Maks Pirnat (1875–1933), journalist and literary and local historian
