= Selce pri Moravčah =

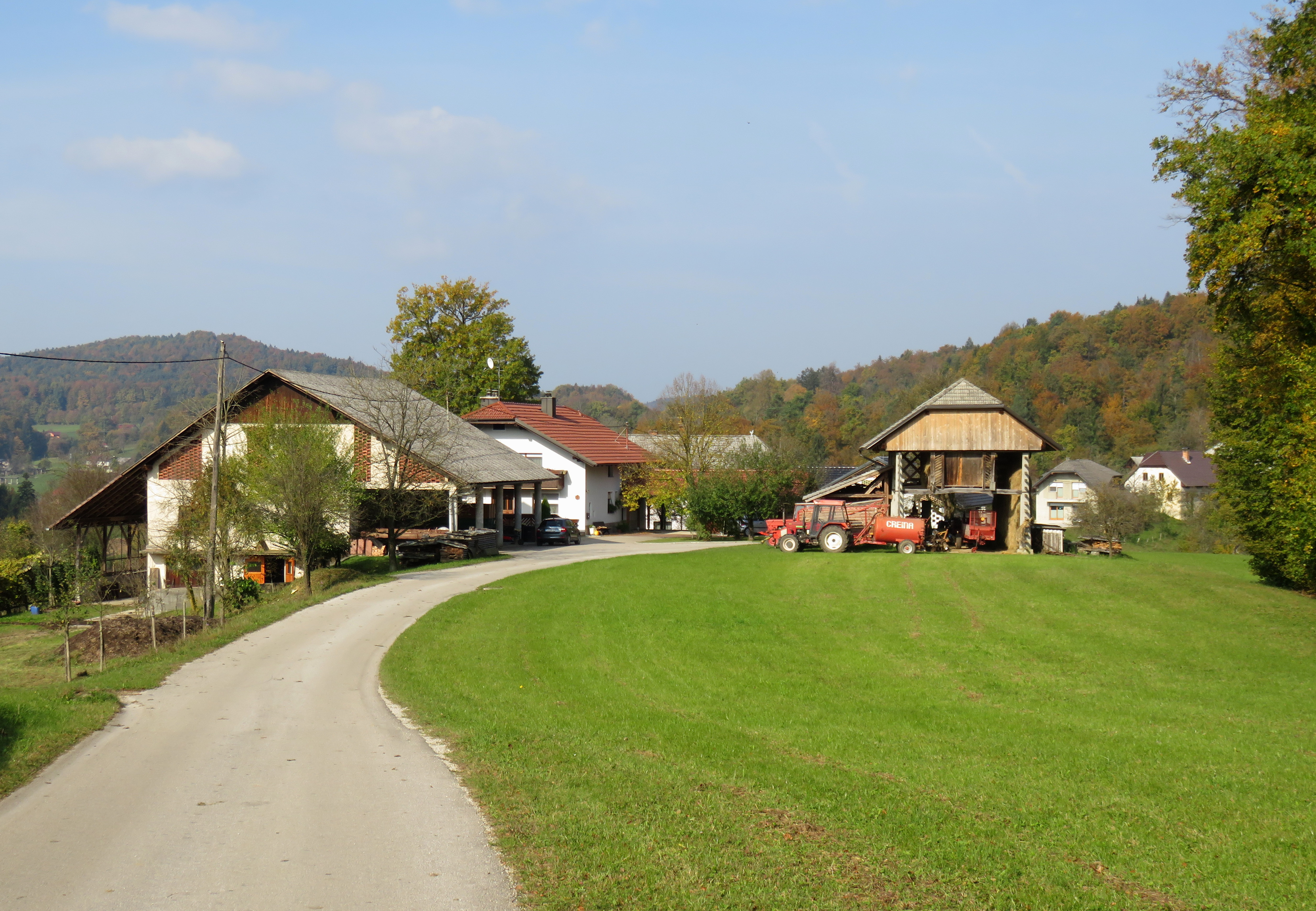

- Location in Slovenia
- Coordinates: 46°8′43.56″N 14°45′43.98″E
- Country: Slovenia
- Traditional region: Upper Carniola
- Statistical region: Central Slovenia
- Municipality: Moravče

Area
  - Total: 0.46 km^{2} (0.18 sq mi)
- Elevation: 407.9 m (1,338 ft)

Population (2002)
  - Total: 33
- Postal code: 1251

Selce pri Moravčah (pronounced [ˈsɛːu̯tsɛ pɾi mɔˈɾaːu̯tʃax]) is a small settlement in the Municipality of Moravče in central Slovenia. The area is part of the traditional region of Upper Carniola. It is now included with the rest of the Municipality of Moravče in the Central Slovenia Statistical Region.

== Name ==
The name of the settlement was changed from Selce to Selce pri Moravčah in 1955.
