= Dvorje, Moravče =

Dvorje
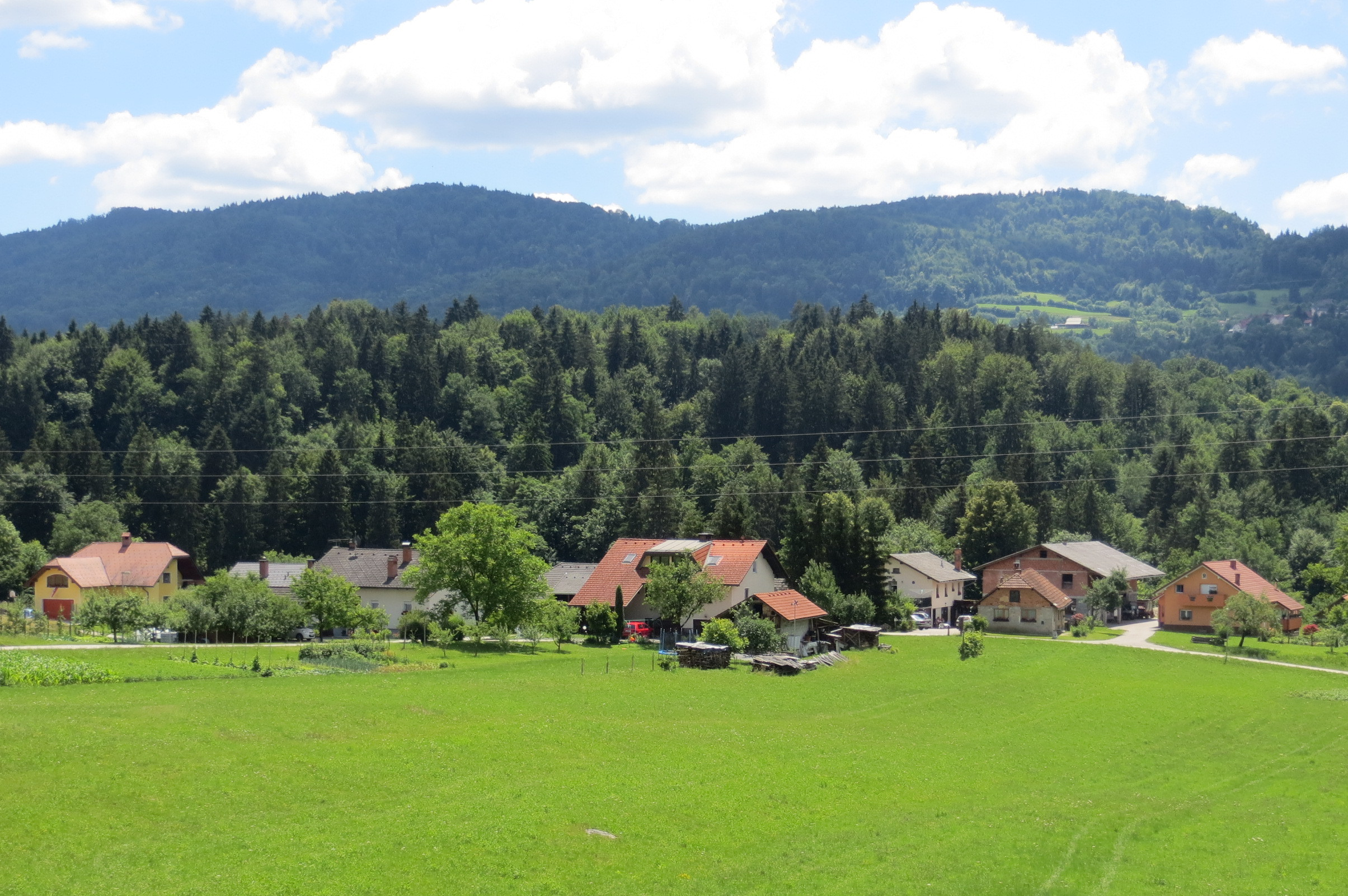

- Location in Slovenia
- Coordinates: 46°8′10.33″N 14°42′16.27″E
- Country: Slovenia
- Traditional region: Upper Carniola
- Statistical region: Central Slovenia
- Municipality: Moravče

Area
  - Total: 0.27 km^{2} (0.10 sq mi)
- Elevation: 341.8 m (1,121 ft)

Population (2002)
  - Total: 38
- Postal code: 1251

Dvorje (pronounced [ˈdʋɔːɾjɛ]) is a small settlement in the Municipality of Moravče in central Slovenia. The area is part of the traditional region of Upper Carniola. It is now included with the rest of the municipality in the Central Slovenia Statistical Region.

== Name ==
Dvorje was attested in historical sources as Dewoͤryach in 1341 and Wuͦr in 1468.
