= Pogled, Moravče =

Pogled
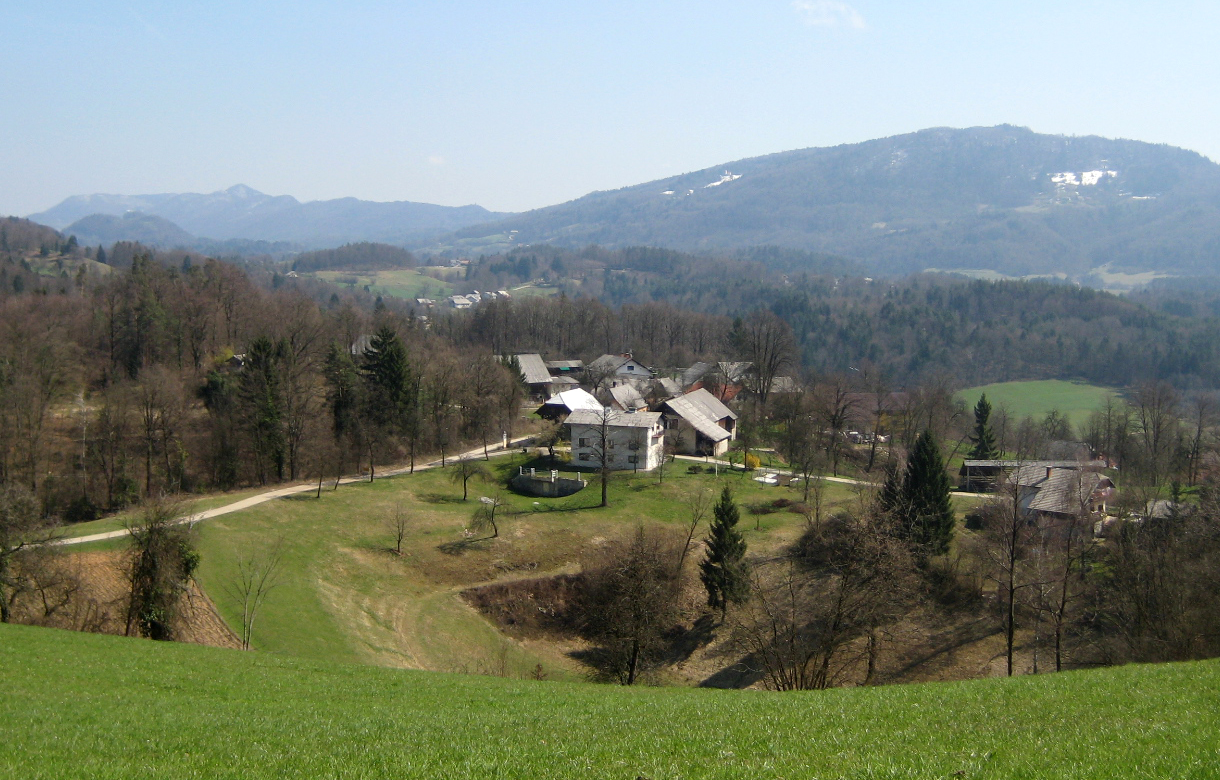

- Location in Slovenia
- Coordinates: 46°8′57.64″N 14°44′38.17″E
- Country: Slovenia
- Traditional region: Upper Carniola
- Statistical region: Central Slovenia
- Municipality: Moravče

Area
  - Total: 0.62 km^{2} (0.24 sq mi)
- Elevation: 438.4 m (1,438 ft)

Population (2002)
  - Total: 41
- Postal code: 1251

Pogled (pronounced [ˈpoːɡlɛt]) is a settlement north of Moravče in central Slovenia. The area is part of the traditional region of Upper Carniola. It is now included with the rest of the Municipality of Moravče in the Central Slovenia Statistical Region.

== Name ==
Pogled was attested in historical sources as Pwͦgled in 1340 and Puͦglod in 1342.
