= Imenje, Moravče =

Imenje
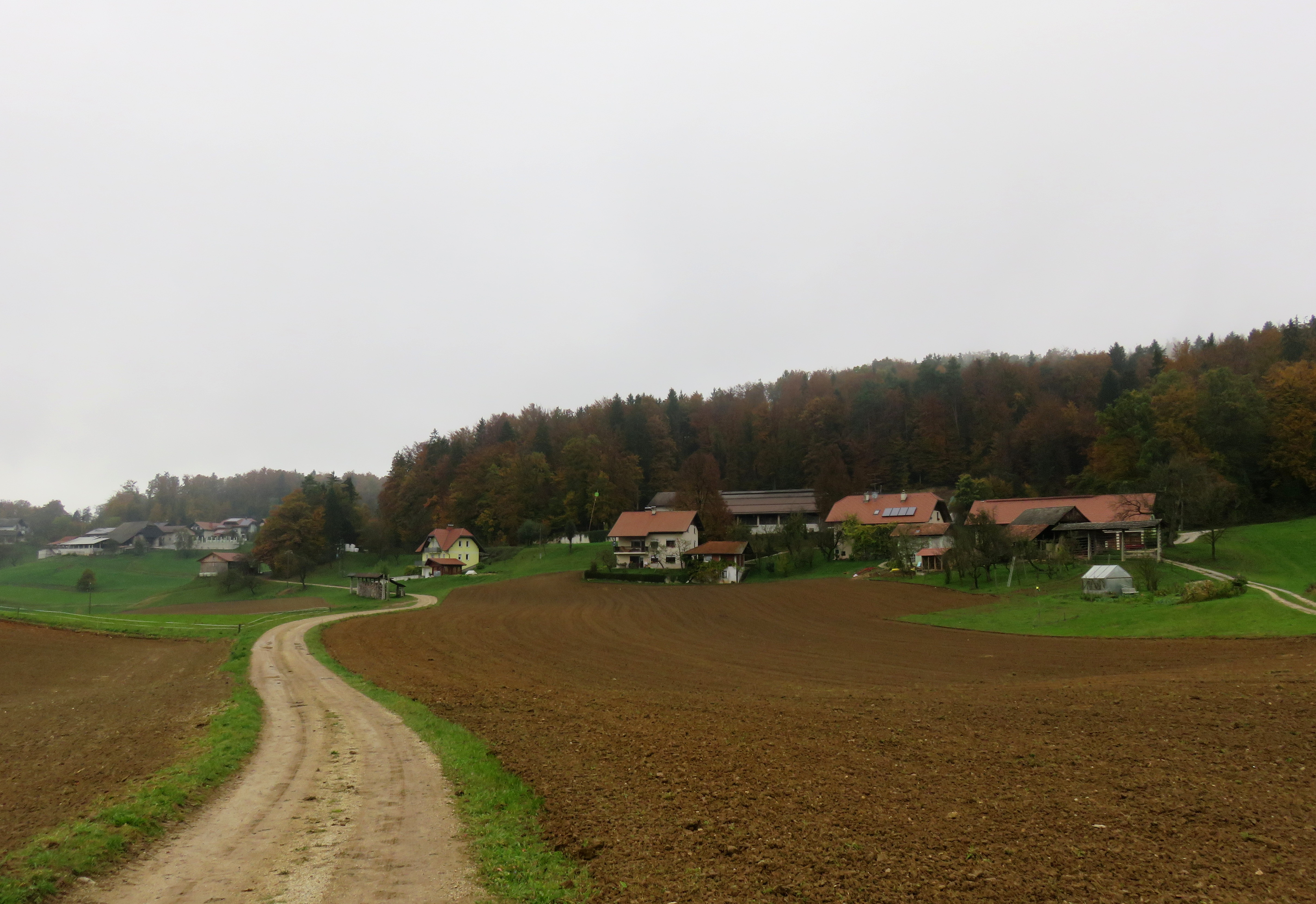

- Location in Slovenia
- Coordinates: 46°8′34.57″N 14°41′54.71″E
- Country: Slovenia
- Traditional region: Upper Carniola
- Statistical region: Central Slovenia
- Municipality: Moravče

Area
  - Total: 0.82 km^{2} (0.32 sq mi)
- Elevation: 382.6 m (1,255 ft)

Population (2002)
  - Total: 97
- Postal code: 1251

Imenje (pronounced [iˈmeːnjɛ]) is a settlement in the Municipality of Moravče in central Slovenia. It lies on the road from Moravče to Prevoje. The area is part of the traditional region of Upper Carniola. It is now included with the rest of the municipality in the Central Slovenia Statistical Region.

== Name ==
Imenje was attested in historical sources as Meny in 1458.
