= Rudnik pri Moravčah =

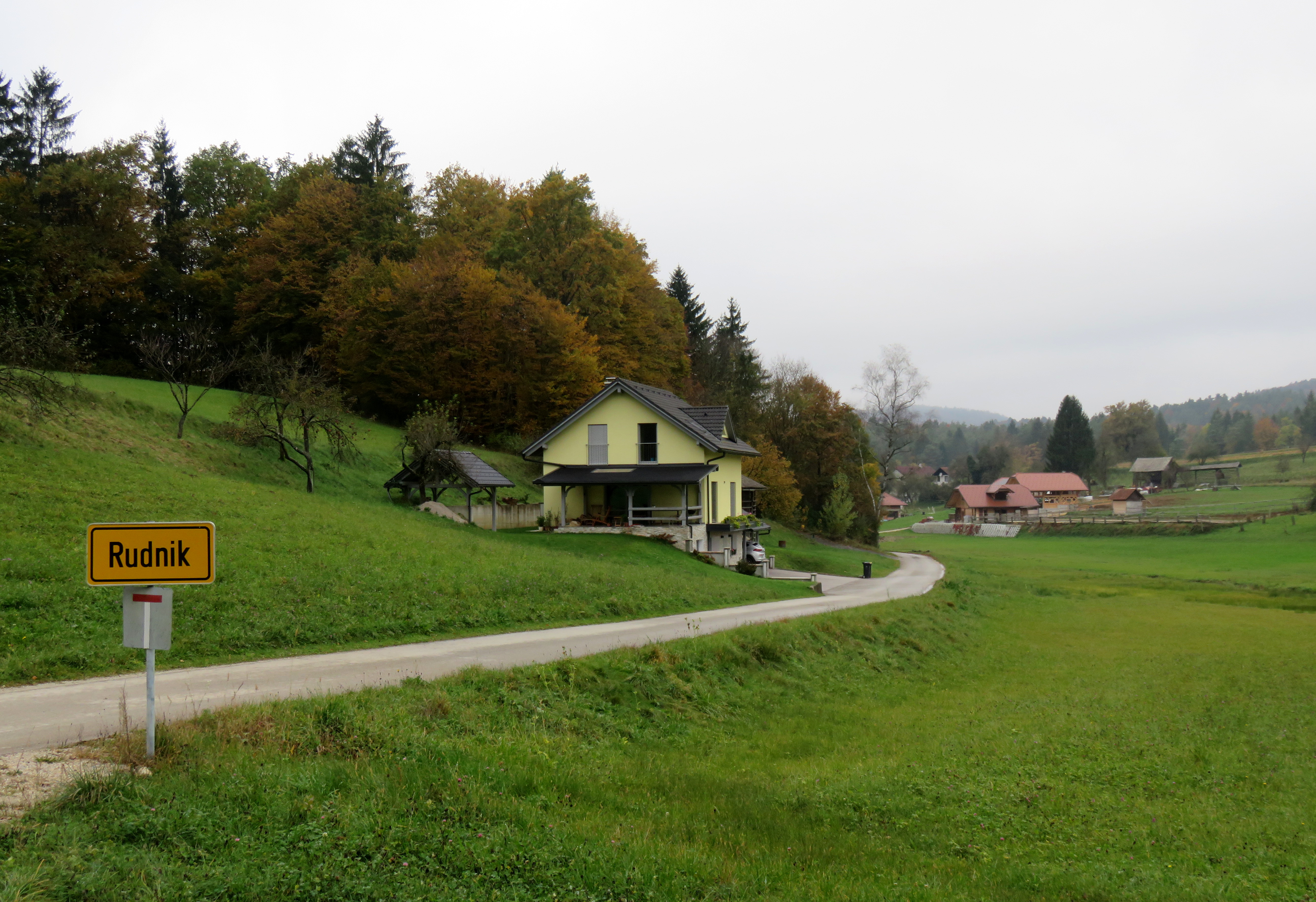

- Location in Slovenia
- Coordinates: 46°8′3.46″N 14°44′1.14″E
- Country: Slovenia
- Traditional region: Upper Carniola
- Statistical region: Central Slovenia
- Municipality: Moravče

Area
  - Total: 0.69 km^{2} (0.27 sq mi)
- Elevation: 348 m (1,142 ft)

Population (2002)
  - Total: 19
- Postal code: 1251

Rudnik pri Moravčah (pronounced [ˈɾuːdnik pɾi mɔˈɾaːu̯tʃax]) is a settlement west of Moravče in central Slovenia. The area is part of the traditional region of Upper Carniola. It is now included with the rest of the Municipality of Moravče in the Central Slovenia Statistical Region.

== Name ==
Rudnik pri Moravčah was attested in historical sources as Rvdnik in 1301, Rudnik in 1414, and Rüdnikh in 1475. The name of the settlement was changed from Rudnik to Rudnik pri Moravčah in 1953.

== Church ==
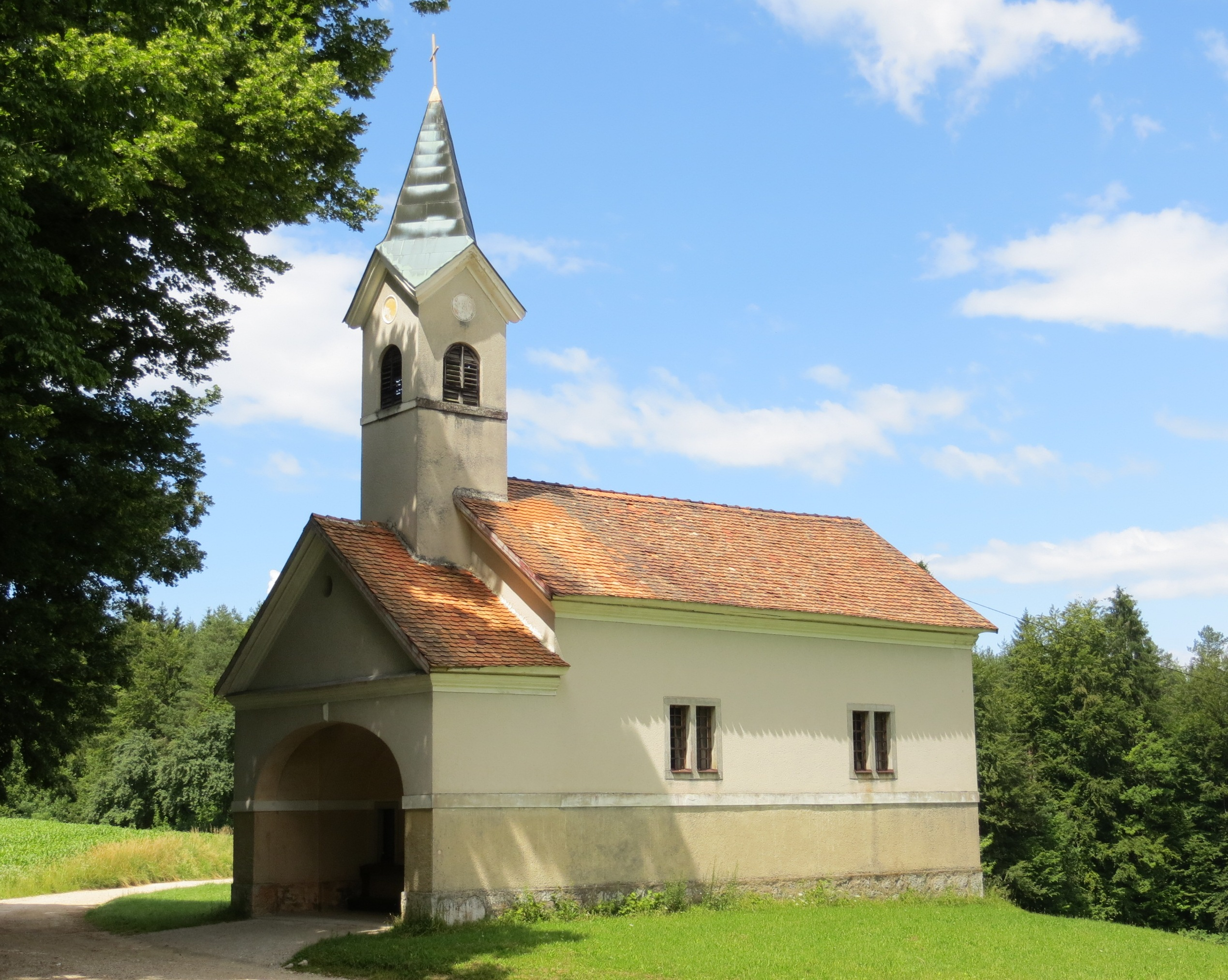
Our Lady of Sorrows Church

The local church, built on Hribce Hill south of the settlement, is dedicated to Our Lady of Sorrows and belongs to the Parish of Moravče. It was built after the 1895 earthquake on the site of an older chapel.
