= Pretrž =

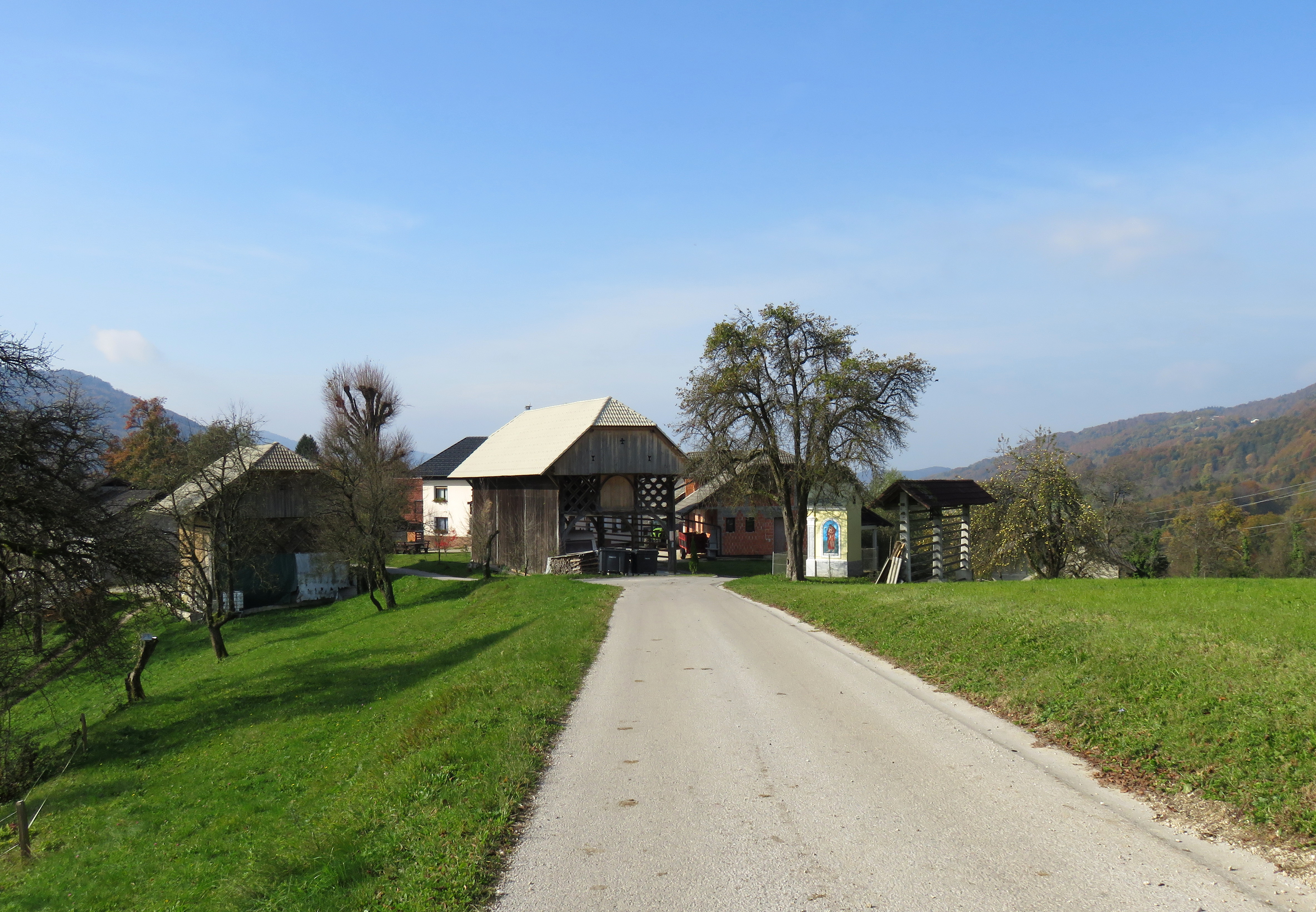

- Location in Slovenia
- Coordinates: 46°08′44″N 14°49′24″E
- Country: Slovenia
- Traditional region: Upper Carniola
- Statistical region: Central Slovenia
- Municipality: Moravče

Area
  - Total: 1.33 km^{2} (0.51 sq mi)
- Elevation: 502.5 m (1,649 ft)

Population (2002)
  - Total: 29
- Postal code: 1251

Pretrž (pronounced [ˈpɾeːtəɾʃ]) is a settlement east of Peče in the Municipality of Moravče in central Slovenia. The area is part of the traditional region of Upper Carniola. It is now included with the rest of the municipality in the Central Slovenia Statistical Region.

== Name ==
Pretrž was attested in historical sources as Prieters in 1386, Pretesz in 1458, and Preters in 1469, among other spellings.
