= Selo pri Moravčah =

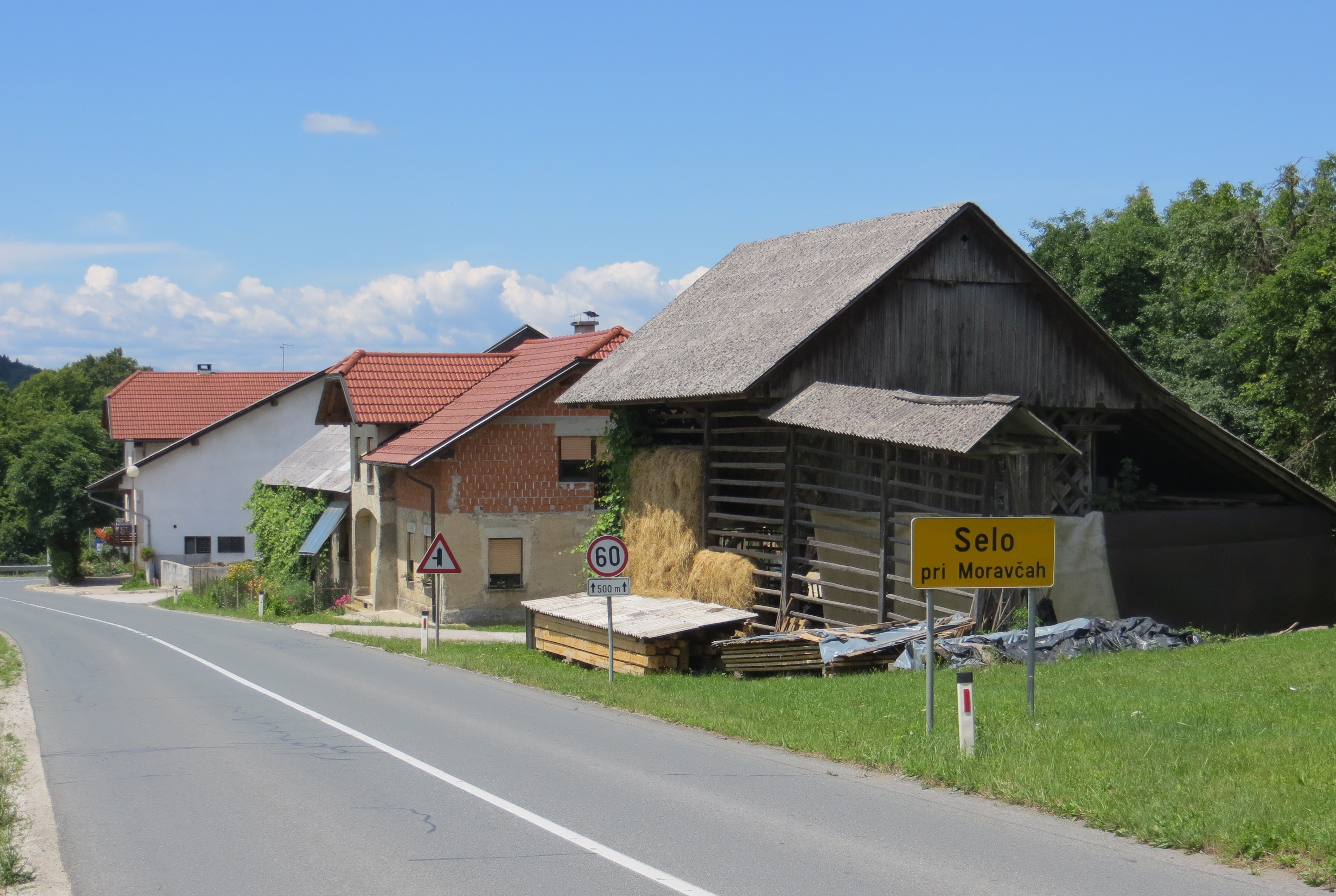

- Location in Slovenia
- Coordinates: 46°8′2.8″N 14°41′44.17″E
- Country: Slovenia
- Traditional region: Upper Carniola
- Statistical region: Central Slovenia
- Municipality: Moravče

Area
  - Total: 0.5 km^{2} (0.19 sq mi)
- Elevation: 399.8 m (1,312 ft)

Population (2002)
  - Total: 62
- Postal code: 1251

Selo pri Moravčah (pronounced [ˈsɛːlɔ pɾi mɔˈɾaːu̯tʃax]) is a settlement in the Municipality of Moravče in central Slovenia. It lies on the main road to Dob west of Moravče. The area is part of the traditional region of Upper Carniola. It is now included with the rest of the municipality in the Central Slovenia Statistical Region.

== Name ==
Selo pri Moravčah was attested in historical sources as Zeell in 1417 and Sell in 1458. The name of the settlement was changed from Selo to Selo pri Moravčah in 1955.
