= Stegne =

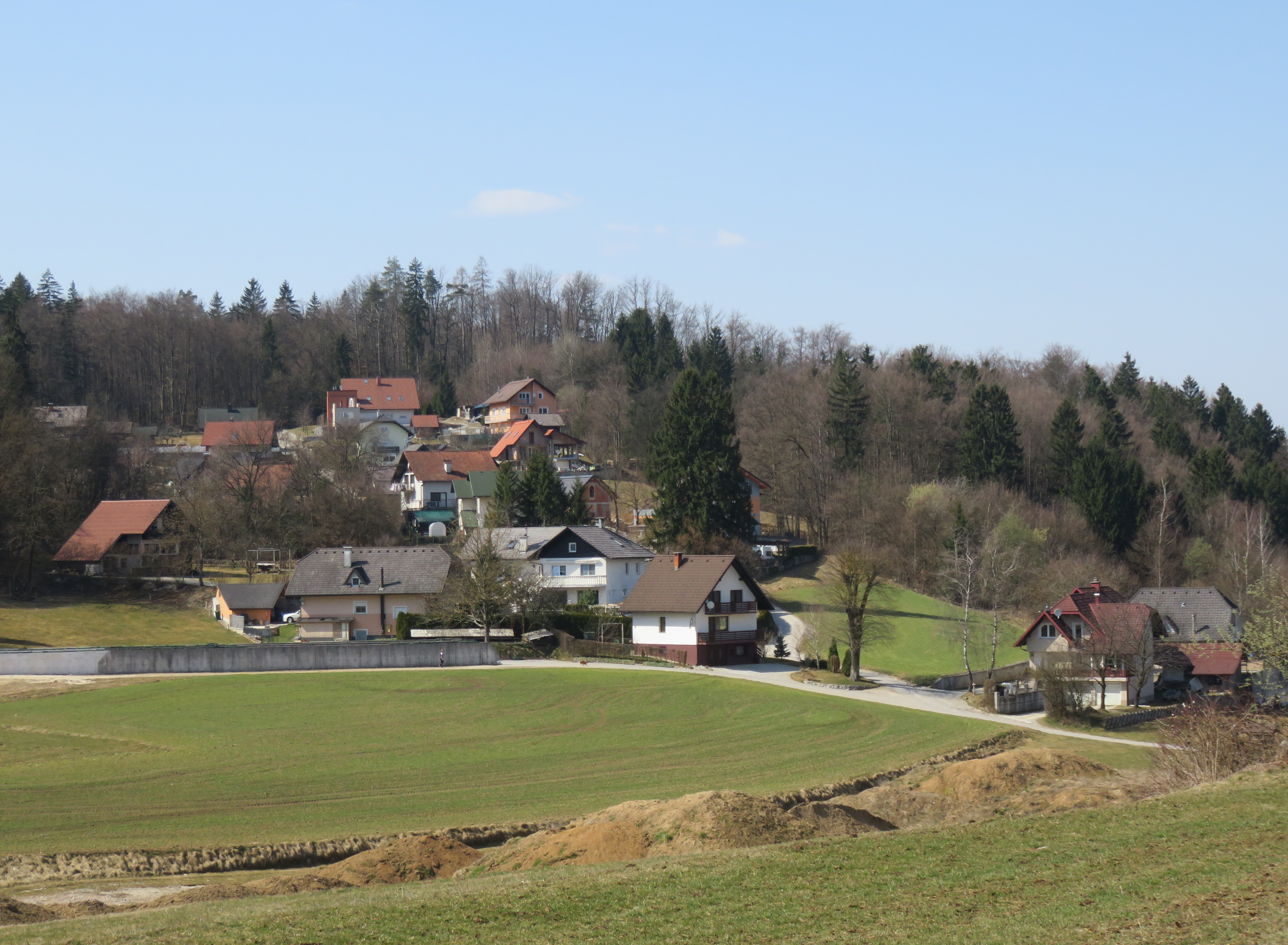

- Location in Slovenia
- Coordinates: 46°7′47.6″N 14°41′53.1″E
- Country: Slovenia
- Traditional region: Upper Carniola
- Statistical region: Central Slovenia
- Municipality: Moravče

Area
  - Total: 0.99 km^{2} (0.38 sq mi)
- Elevation: 361.2 m (1,185 ft)

Population (2002)
  - Total: 140
- Postal code: 1251

Stegne (pronounced [ˈstəɡnɛ]) is a village in the Municipality of Moravče in central Slovenia. The area is part of the traditional region of Upper Carniola. It is now included with the rest of the municipality in the Central Slovenia Statistical Region.

== Name ==
Stegne was attested in historical sources as Stäinicz and Stainitz in 1431.

== Cultural heritage ==
A small chapel-shrine in the middle of the older eastern part of the settlement dates to the 19th century.
