= Negastrn =

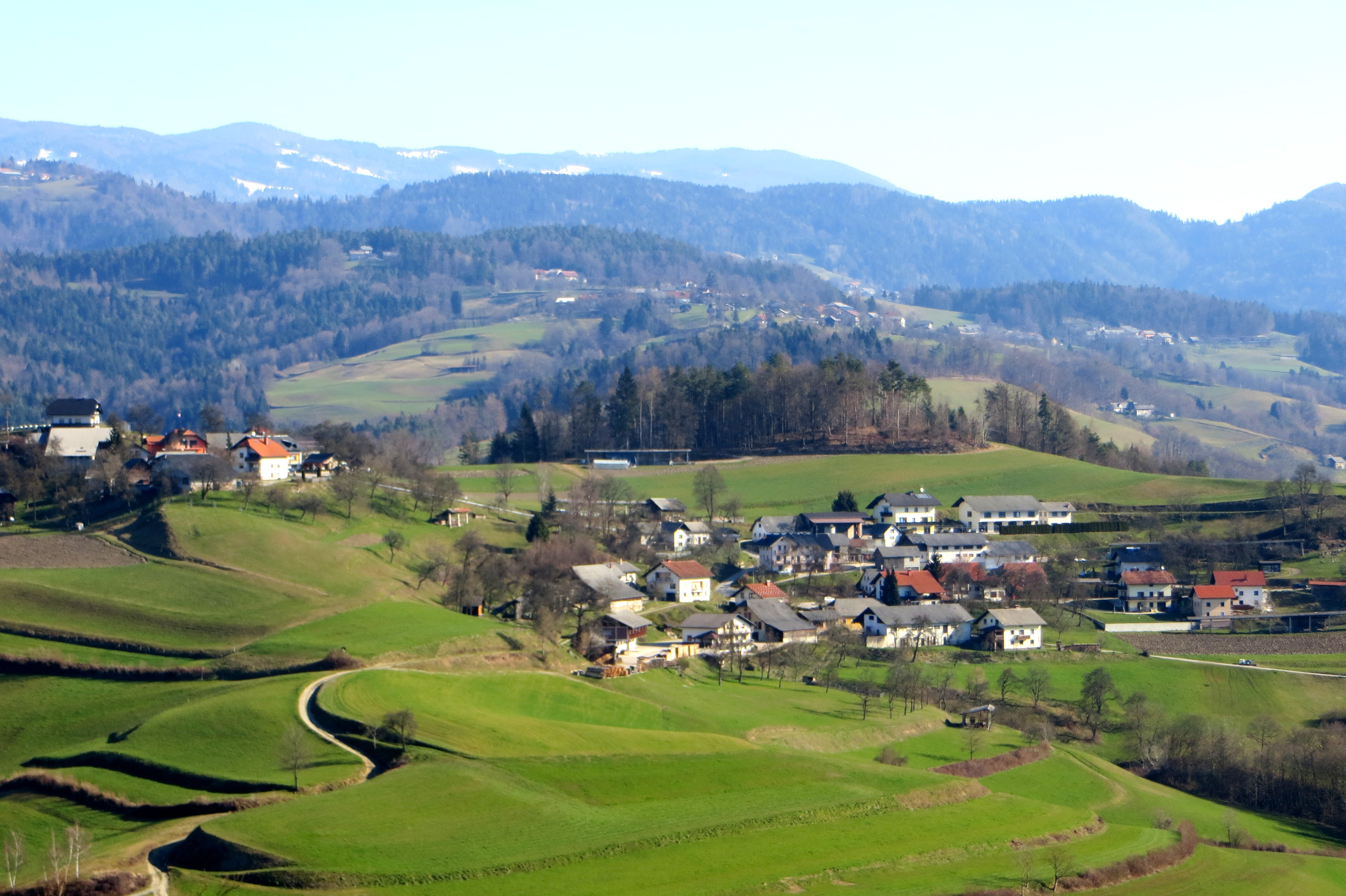

- Location in Slovenia
- Coordinates: 46°9′34.56″N 14°44′34.73″E
- Country: Slovenia
- Traditional region: Upper Carniola
- Statistical region: Central Slovenia
- Municipality: Moravče

Area
  - Total: 1.49 km^{2} (0.58 sq mi)
- Elevation: 464 m (1,522 ft)

Population (2002)
  - Total: 90
- Postal code: 1251

Negastrn (pronounced [ˈneːɡastəɾn]) is a settlement north of Moravče in central Slovenia. The area is part of the traditional region of Upper Carniola. It is now included with the rest of the Municipality of Moravče in the Central Slovenia Statistical Region. The settlement includes the hamlets of Spodnja Vas (Slovene: Spodnja vas, German: Unternegastern), Zgornja Vas (Slovene: Zgornja vas, German: Obernegastern), and Podoreh.

== Name ==
Negastrn was attested in historical sources in 1348 as Nogostrinne, in 1363 as Negoztrm, in 1367 as Negostrin, in 1370 as Negroscrim, in 1425 as Negosdrin, and in 1489 as Negnastrin. It is hypothesized that the name is derived from *Něgostryjьnъ (vьrhъ) 'Něgostryjь's (peak)', referring to an early person associated with the place and its elevated location.
