= Spodnji Tuštanj =

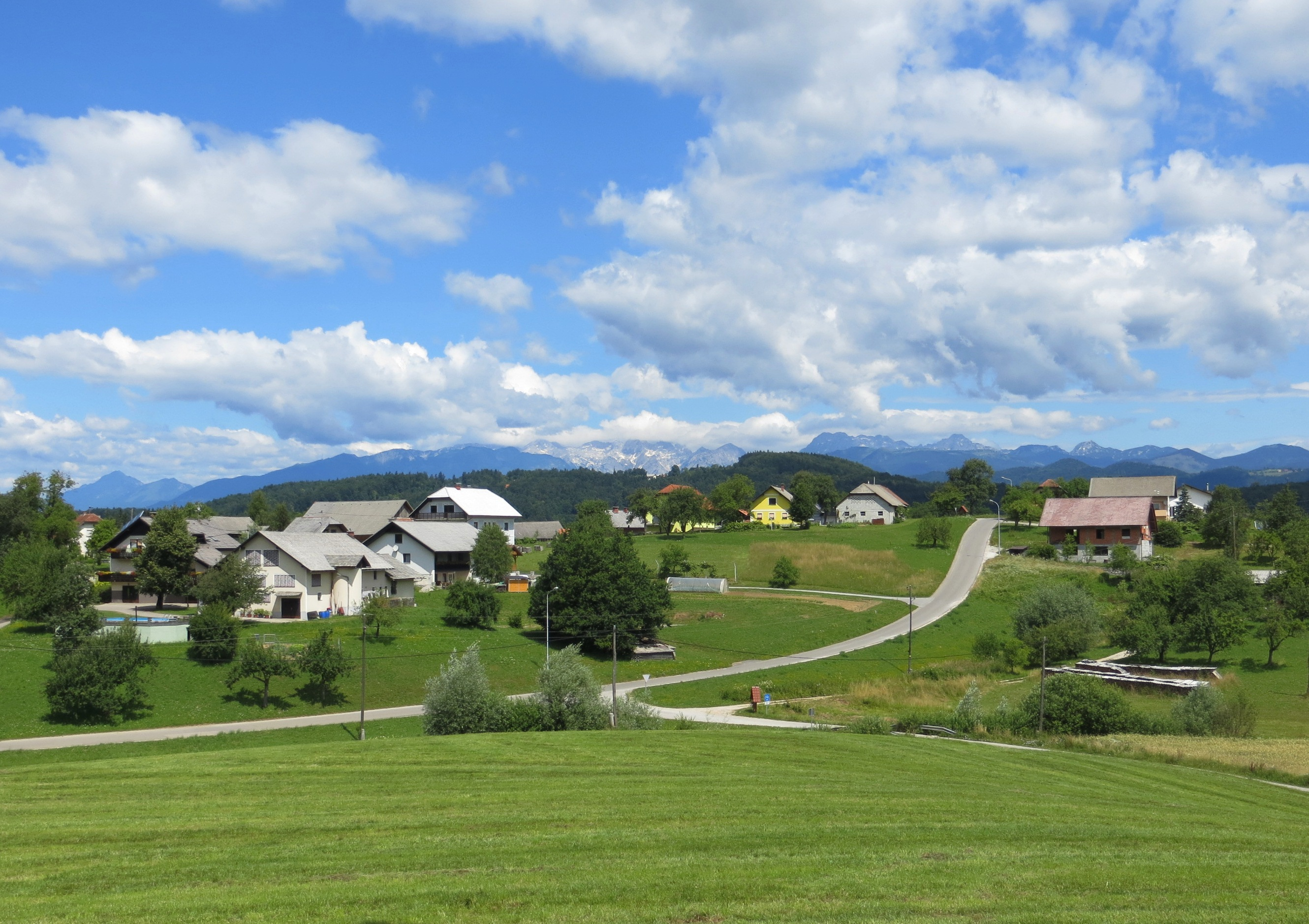

- Location in Slovenia
- Coordinates: 46°7′49.41″N 14°43′8.56″E
- Country: Slovenia
- Traditional region: Upper Carniola
- Statistical region: Central Slovenia
- Municipality: Moravče

Area
  - Total: 0.94 km^{2} (0.36 sq mi)
- Elevation: 360.5 m (1,183 ft)

Population (2002)
  - Total: 101
- Postal code: 1251

Spodnji Tuštanj (pronounced [ˈspoːdnji ˈtuːʃtan]; German: Untertufstein) is a settlement in the Municipality of Moravče in central Slovenia. The area is part of the traditional region of Upper Carniola. It is now included with the rest of the municipality in the Central Slovenia Statistical Region.

== Name ==
Spodnji Tuštanj was attested in historical sources as Tuftstein in 1260, Taustayn in 1335, Tenztain in 1494, and Twfcstain in 1496, among other spellings.
