= Zgornje Koseze =

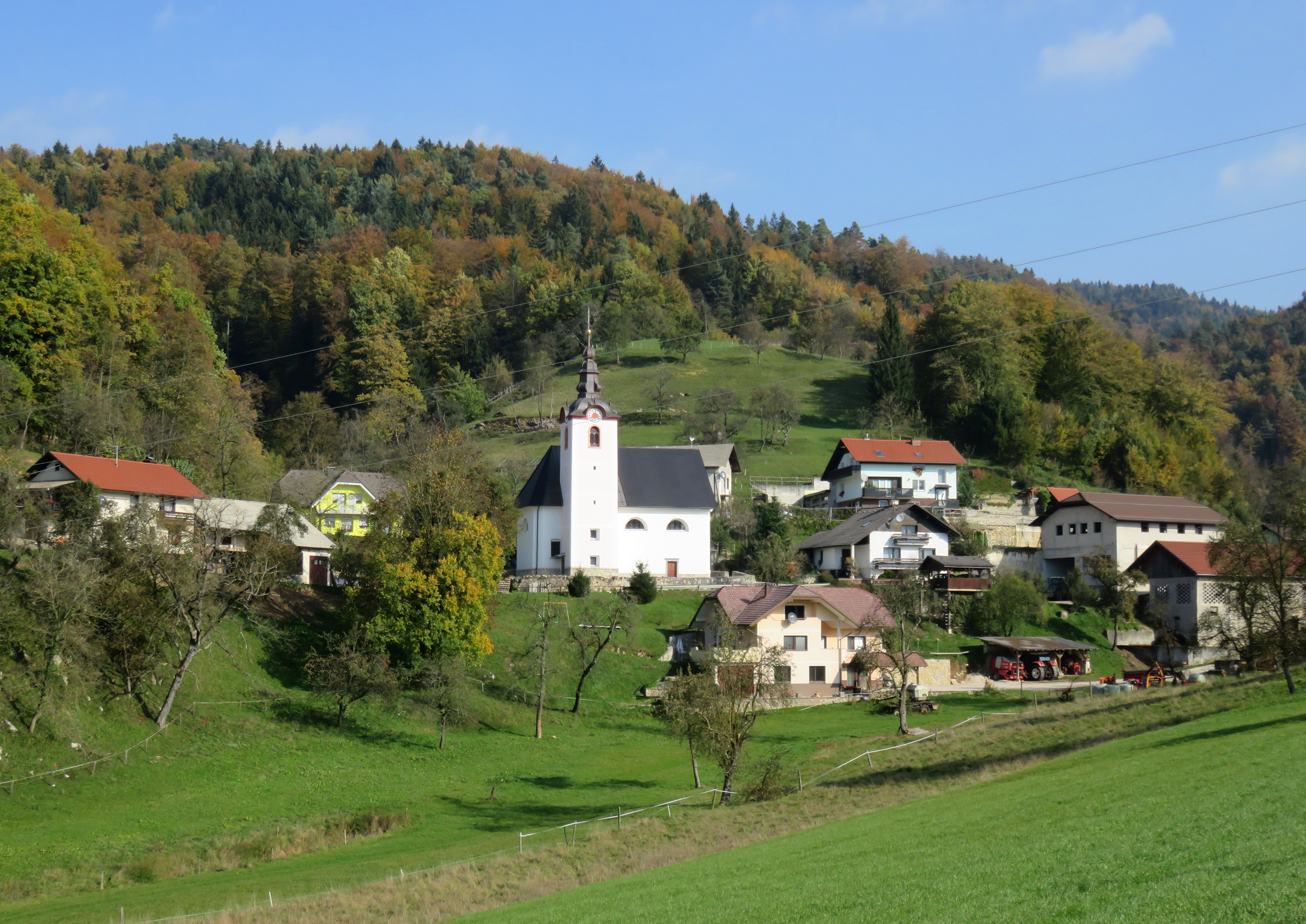

- Location in Slovenia
- Coordinates: 46°8′57.71″N 14°47′59.96″E
- Country: Slovenia
- Traditional region: Upper Carniola
- Statistical region: Central Slovenia
- Municipality: Moravče

Area
  - Total: 0.87 km^{2} (0.34 sq mi)
- Elevation: 460.7 m (1,511 ft)

Population (2002)
  - Total: 81
- Postal code: 1251

Zgornje Koseze (pronounced [ˈzɡoːɾnjɛ kɔˈseːzɛ]; German: Oberkoses) is a village in the Municipality of Moravče in central Slovenia. The area is part of the traditional region of Upper Carniola. It is now included with the rest of the municipality in the Central Slovenia Statistical Region.

== Geography ==
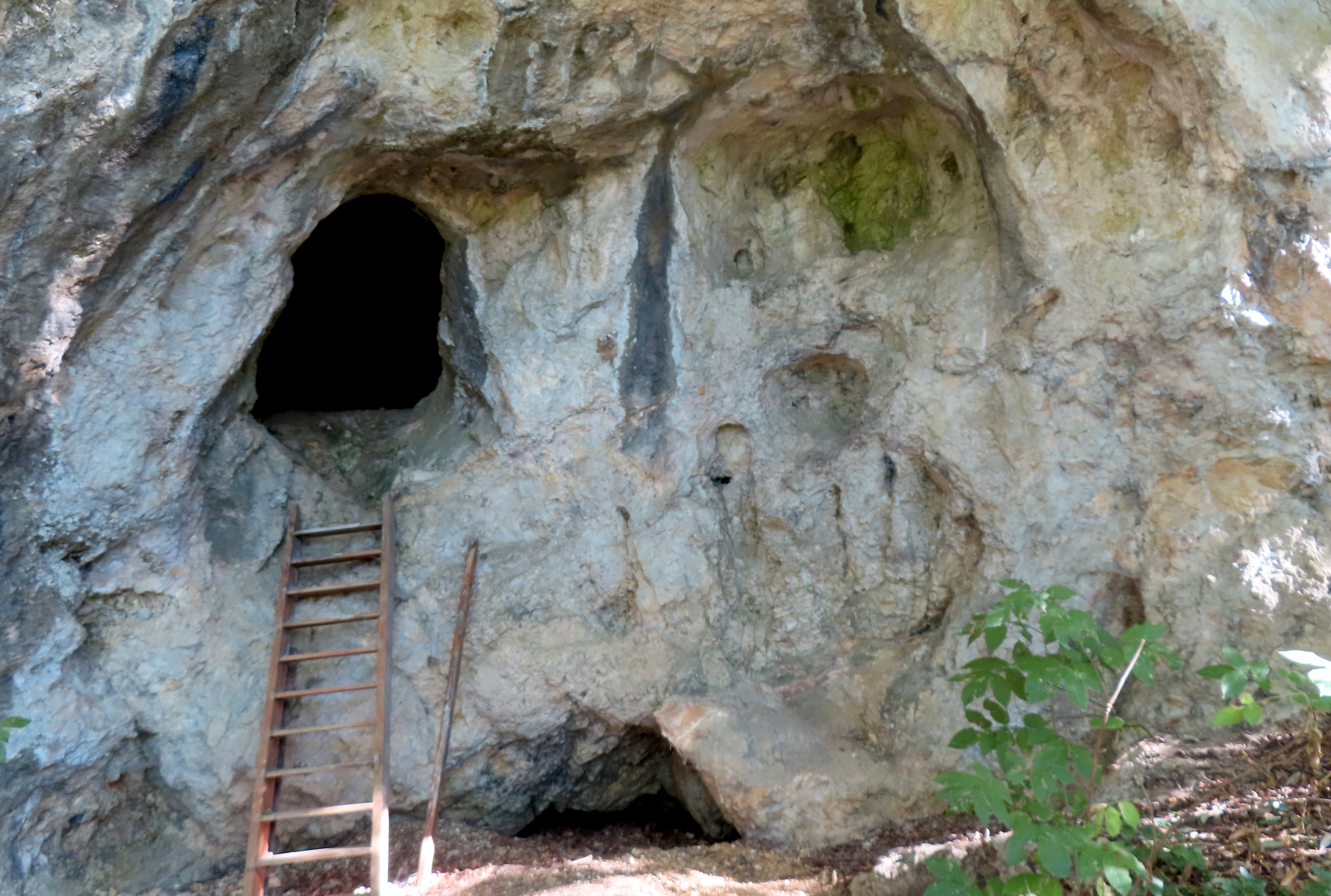
Lovrišnik Cave

Zgornje Koseze is about 25 kilometers (16 mi) from the capital city of Ljubljana. There are two caves in Zgornje Koseze. Ukač Cave (Slovene: Ukačeva jama) is located west of the church and has a depth of 8 meters (26 ft) and a length of 8 meters (26 ft). Lovrišnik Cave (Slovene: Lovrišnikova jama, also known as Ziuka, Vršnikova jama, or Uršnikova jama) is located east of the village; it has a depth of 2 meters (6 ft 7 in) and a length of 12 meters (39 ft).

== History ==
In the 1920s and 1930s, a hermit named Janez Mlinar lived in Lovrišnik Cave. He was photographed in 1931 by the cave photographer Franci Bar (1901–1988) and dubbed the "last cave dweller" in Slovenia. Mlinar eventually moved into a small stone and wooden shack next to the cave built on a stone embankment with the assistance of locals.

== Church ==
The local church is dedicated to Saint Stephen and belongs to the Parish of Moravče. It was a Gothic building that was restyled in the Baroque in 1753.
