= Dole pri Krašcah =

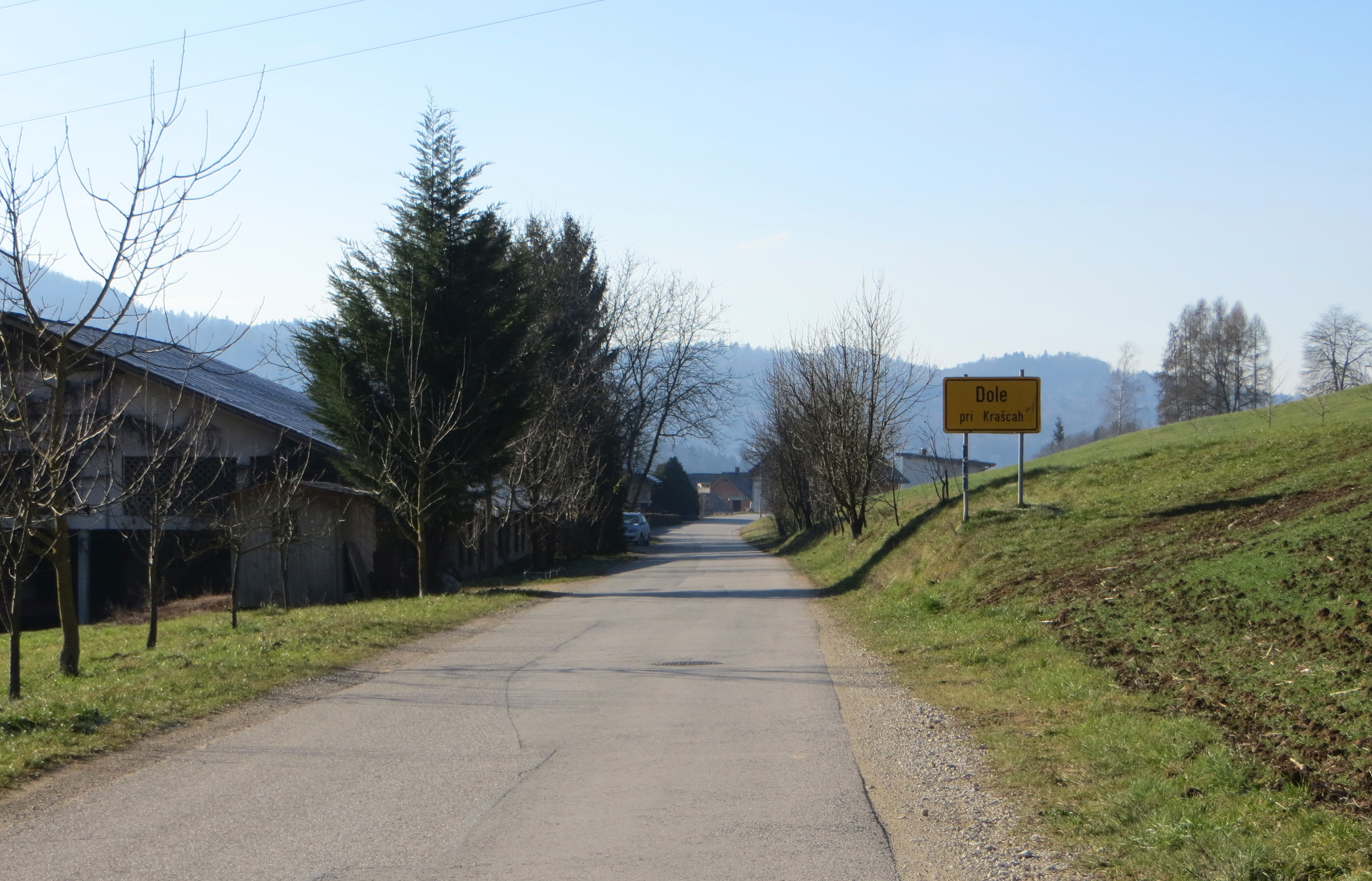

- Location in Slovenia
- Coordinates: 46°8′28.25″N 14°42′57.18″E
- Country: Slovenia
- Traditional region: Upper Carniola
- Statistical region: Central Slovenia
- Municipality: Moravče

Area
  - Total: 1.03 km^{2} (0.40 sq mi)
- Elevation: 370.8 m (1,217 ft)

Population (2002)
  - Total: 175
- Postal code: 1251

Dole pri Krašcah (pronounced [ˈdoːlɛ pɾi ˈkɾaːʃtsax]) is a settlement to the west of Moravče in central Slovenia. The area is part of the traditional region of Upper Carniola. It is now included with the rest of the Municipality of Moravče in the Central Slovenia Statistical Region.

== Name ==
Dole pri Krašcah was attested in historical sources as Süchadol and Suchadol in 1431, Suchodol in 1444, and Suchodoll in 1470.
