= Municipality of Moravče =

Municipality of Slovenia

Municipality of Moravče Občina Moravče
- Municipality
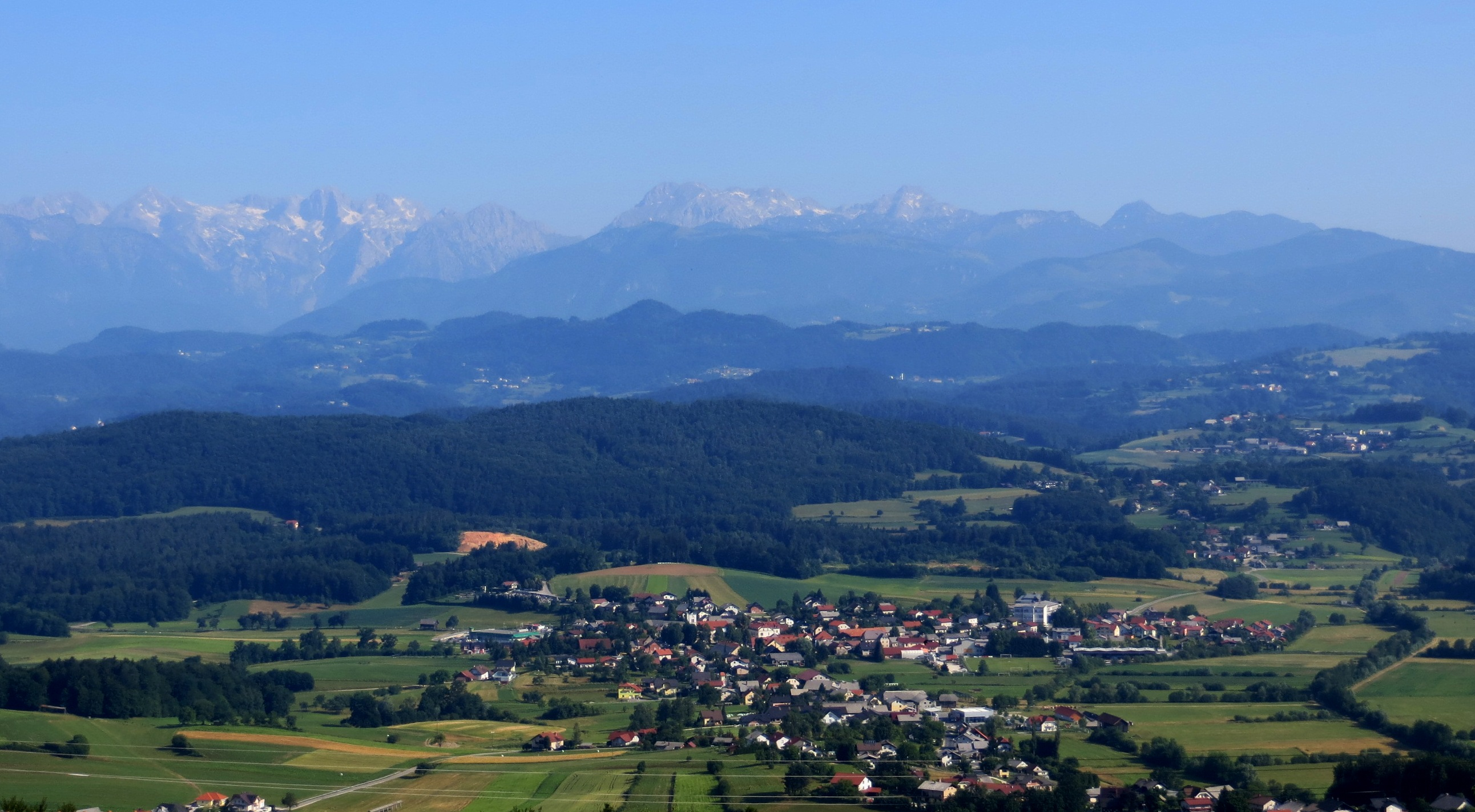

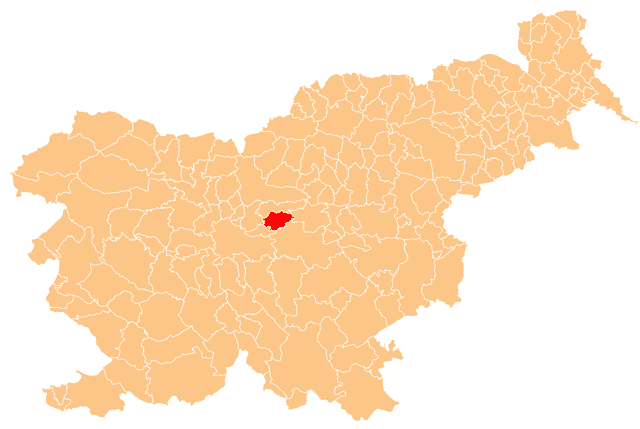
- Location of the Municipality of Moravče in Slovenia
- Coordinates: 46°8′N 14°45′E
- Country: Slovenia

Government
  - Mayor: Milan Balažic (Independent)

Area
  - Total: 61.4 km^{2} (23.7 sq mi)

Population (2018)
  - Total: 5,354
  - Density: 87.2/km^{2} (226/sq mi)
- Time zone: UTC+01 (CET)
  - Summer (DST): UTC+02 (CEST)
- Website: www.moravce.si

The Municipality of Moravče (pronounced [mɔˈɾaːu̯tʃɛ]; Slovene: Občina Moravče) is a municipality in the traditional region of Upper Carniola in central Slovenia. The seat of the municipality is the town of Moravče. Moravče became a municipality in 1994.

== Settlements ==
In addition to the municipal seat of Moravče, the municipality also includes the following settlements:

- Češnjice pri Moravčah
- Dešen
- Dole pod Sveto Trojico
- Dole pri Krašcah
- Drtija
- Dvorje
- Gabrje pod Limbarsko Goro
- Gora pri Pečah
- Gorica
- Goričica pri Moravčah
- Hrastnik
- Hrib nad Ribčami
- Imenje
- Katarija
- Krašce
- Križate
- Limbarska Gora
- Mošenik
- Negastrn
- Peče
- Ples
- Podgorica pri Pečah
- Podstran
- Pogled
- Pretrž
- Prikrnica
- Rudnik pri Moravčah
- Selce pri Moravčah
- Selo pri Moravčah
- Serjuče
- Soteska pri Moravčah
- Spodnja Dobrava
- Spodnja Javoršica
- Spodnji Prekar
- Spodnji Tuštanj
- Stegne
- Straža pri Moravčah
- Sveti Andrej
- Velika Vas
- Vinje pri Moravčah
- Vrhpolje pri Moravčah
- Zalog pri Kresnicah
- Zalog pri Moravčah
- Zgornja Dobrava
- Zgornja Javoršica
- Zgornje Koseze
- Zgornji Prekar
- Zgornji Tuštanj
