= Kuga =

Kuga may refer to:

- Ford Kuga, midsize car produced by Ford
- Kuga (dog), male Belgian Malinois military dog serving with the Australian Army
- Kuga District, Yamaguchi, district located in Yamaguchi Prefecture, Japan
- Kuga, Gunma, village located in Tone District, northern Gunma Prefecture, Japan
- Kuga fiber variety
- Kuga, Moravče, a former village in the Municipality of Moravče, Slovenia
- Kuga Station, railway station on the Gantoku Line in Iwakuni, Yamaguchi, Japan
- Kuga Naa, elder in the court of the Yaa Naa, in the Kingdom of Dagbon in northern Ghan
- Kuga, Yamaguchi, town located in Kuga District, Yamaguchi Prefecture, Japan

== People ==
- Michio Kuga, Japanese mathematician
- Nikola Kuga, Serbian professional basketball player
- Yoshiko Kuga, Japanese actress
- Kuga Katsunan, pen-name of a journalist in the Meiji period Empire of Japan
