= Trzen =

- Location in Slovenia
- Coordinates: 46°7′58″N 14°44′49″E
- Country: Slovenia
- Traditional region: Upper Carniola
- Statistical region: Central Slovenia
- Municipality: Moravče
- Elevation: 375 m (1,230 ft)

Trzen (Slovene pronunciation: [ˈtəɾzən], in older sources also Trzin, German: Tersen) is a former settlement in the Municipality of Moravče in central Slovenia. It is now part of the town of Moravče. The area is part of the traditional region of Upper Carniola. The municipality is now included in the Central Slovenia Statistical Region.

== Geography ==
Trzen lies in the southeastern part of the town of Moravče, at the intersection with the road to Češnjice pri Moravčah along the main road to Drtija.

== Name ==
The name Trzen is derived from the adjective trzen 'fallow', referring to the local geography. The common nouns trznina 'fallow land' and trzna 'unplanted field' are also derived from the adjective, as is the related place name Trzin.

== History ==
Trzen had a population of 46 living in 10 houses in 1900. Trzen was annexed by Moravče in 1952, ending its existence as an independent settlement.
