= Mala Ravan =

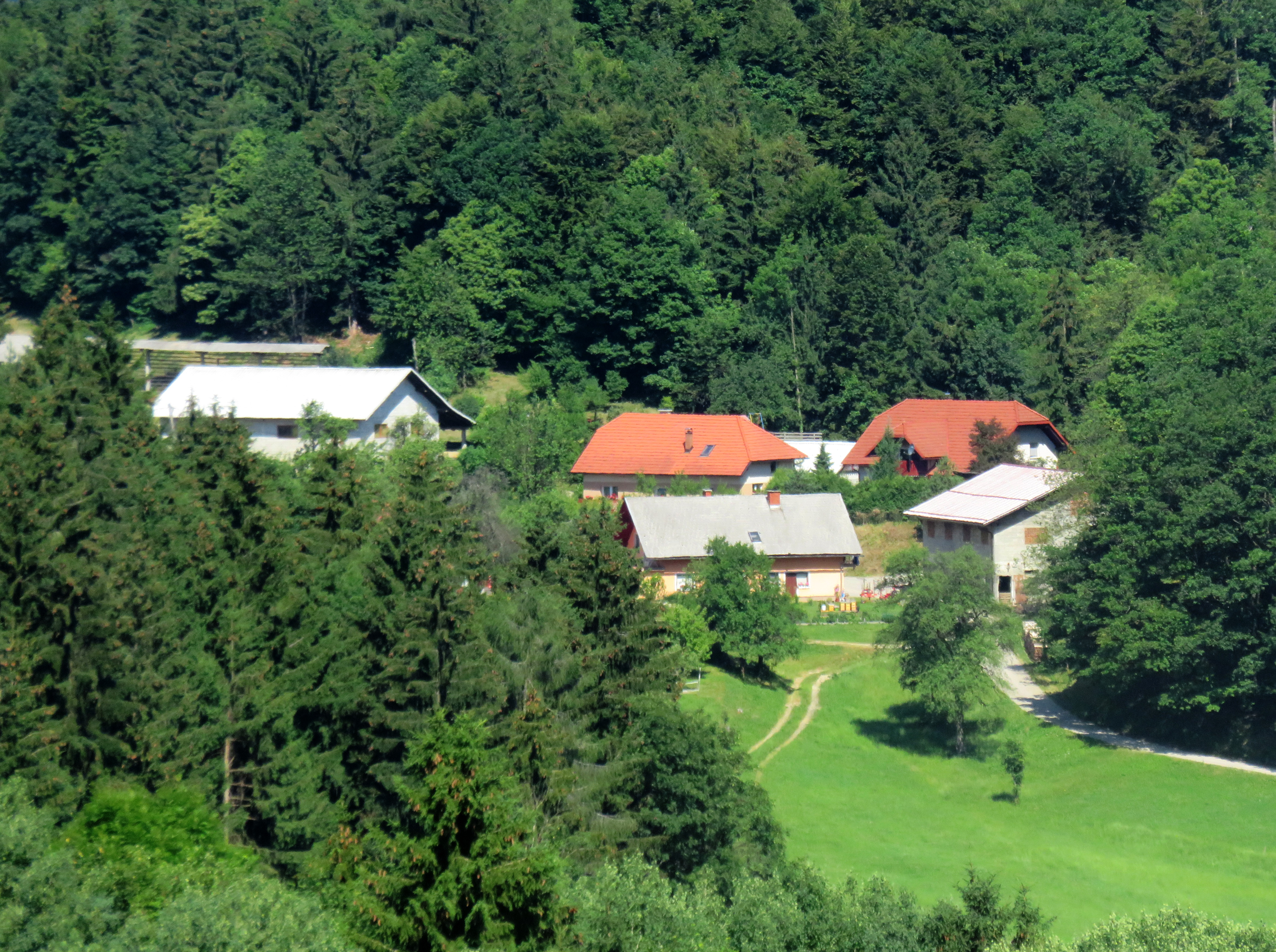

- Location in Slovenia
- Coordinates: 46°12′29″N 14°52′17″E
- Country: Slovenia
- Traditional region: Upper Carniola
- Statistical region: Central Slovenia
- Municipality: Kamnik
- Elevation: 670 m (2,200 ft)

Mala Ravan (pronounced [ˈmaːla ɾaˈʋaːn], locally [ˈmaːla ˈɾaːu̯n], sometimes also Mali Raven or Mala raven, German: Kleinraun) is a former settlement in the Municipality of Kamnik in central Slovenia. It is now part of the village of Bela. The area is part of the traditional region of Upper Carniola. The municipality is now included in the Central Slovenia Statistical Region.

== Geography ==
Mala Ravan lies in the southern part of Bela, in a small valley between Smolnik Hill (elevation: 733 meters or 2,405 feet) to the north and Vrhe Hill (elevation: 901 meters or 2,956 feet) to the south.

== Name ==
Mala Ravan was attested as Klain eben in 1488. The name Mala Ravan means 'little Ravan' and contrasts with Velika Ravan 'big Ravan', a hamlet of Hribi about 500 meters (1,600 ft) to the south. The common noun ravan 'flatland, plateau' is relatively common in Slovene toponyms.

== History ==
Mala Ravan was annexed by Bela in 1952, ending its existence as a separate settlement.

== Cultural heritage ==
There is a wayside shrine in Mala Ravan that is registered as cultural heritage. The shrine stands on the western edge of the settlement and dates from the twentieth century.
