= Šija =

- Location in Slovenia
- Coordinates: 46°9′35″N 14°47′5″E
- Country: Slovenia
- Traditional region: Upper Carniola
- Statistical region: Central Slovenia
- Municipality: Moravče
- Elevation: 705 m (2,313 ft)

Šija (Slovene pronunciation: [ˈʃiːja]) is a former settlement in the Municipality of Moravče in central Slovenia. It is now part of the village of Limbarska Gora. The area is part of the traditional region of Upper Carniola. The municipality is now included in the Central Slovenia Statistical Region.

== Geography ==
Šija lies in the eastern part of the village of Limbarska Gora, on the eastern slope of the hill ascending to the main settlement.

== History ==
Šija had a population of 14 living in two houses in 1900. Šija was annexed by Limbarska Gora (at that time still called Sveti Valentin) in 1952, ending its existence as an independent settlement.
