= Reber, Moravče =

Reber
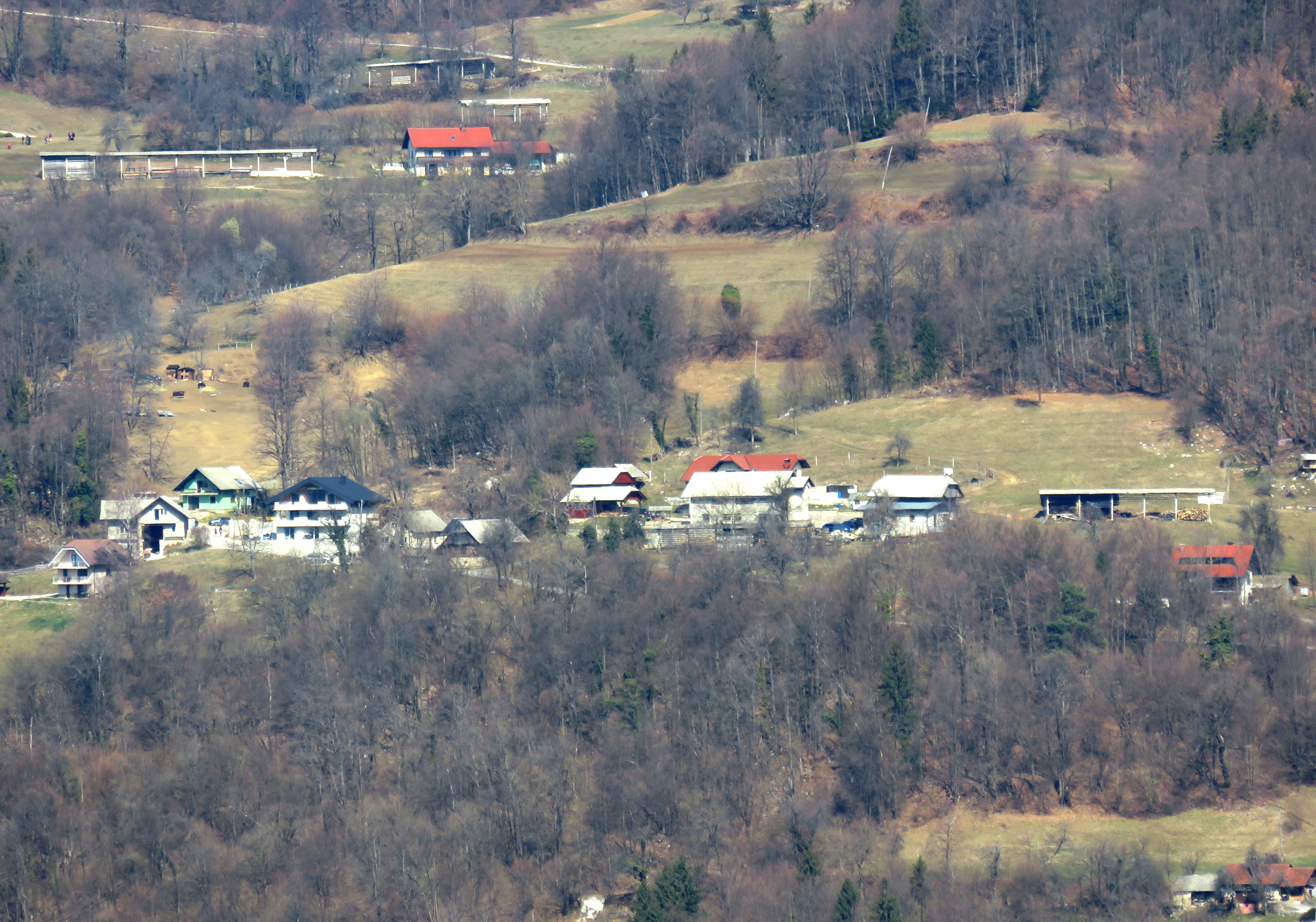

- Location in Slovenia
- Coordinates: 46°9′3″N 14°46′16″E
- Country: Slovenia
- Traditional region: Upper Carniola
- Statistical region: Central Slovenia
- Municipality: Moravče
- Elevation: 554 m (1,818 ft)

Reber (Slovene pronunciation: [ˈɾeːbəɾ]) is a former settlement in the Municipality of Moravče in central Slovenia. It is now part of the village of Limbarska Gora. The area is part of the traditional region of Upper Carniola. The municipality is now included in the Central Slovenia Statistical Region.

== Geography ==
Reber lies in the southern part of the village of Limbarska Gora, below the south slope of the hill ascending to the main settlement.

== History ==
Reber had a population of 23 living in four houses in 1880 and in 1900. Reber was annexed by Limbarska Gora (at that time still called Sveti Valentin) in 1952, ending its existence as an independent settlement.
