= Podbrdo, Moravče =

Podbrdo
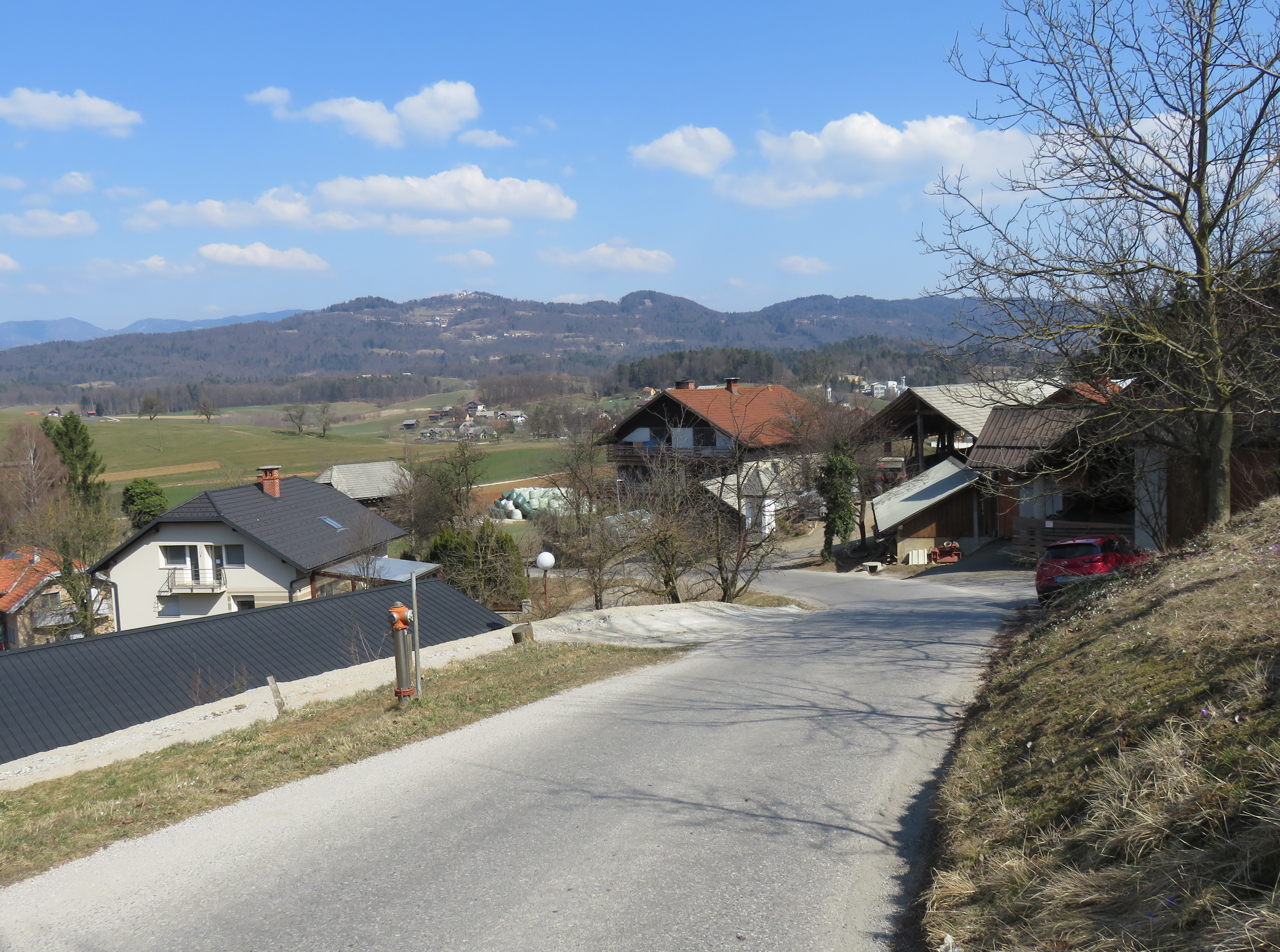

- Location in Slovenia
- Coordinates: 46°7′22″N 14°45′18″E
- Country: Slovenia
- Traditional region: Upper Carniola
- Statistical region: Central Slovenia
- Municipality: Moravče
- Elevation: 410 m (1,350 ft)

Podbrdo (Slovene pronunciation: [pɔbˈbəɾdɔ]) is a former settlement in the Municipality of Moravče in central Slovenia. It is now part of the villages of Drtija and Češnjice pri Moravčah. The area is part of the traditional region of Upper Carniola. The municipality is now included in the Central Slovenia Statistical Region.

== Geography ==
Podbrdo lies between Drtija and Češnjice pri Moravčah along the road descending from the Grmače Pass. The houses on the west side of the road belong to Češnjice pri Moravčah, and those on the east side are part of Drtija.

== Name ==
The name Podbrdo is a fused prepositional phrase that has lost its case inflection, from pod 'below' + brdo 'hill', referring to the local geography.

== History ==
Podbrdo is one of the comparatively older settlements in the area. Podbrdo had a population of 16 living in three houses in 1900. Podbrdo was annexed by Drtija in 1952, ending its existence as an independent settlement.
