= Klen, Moravče =

Klen
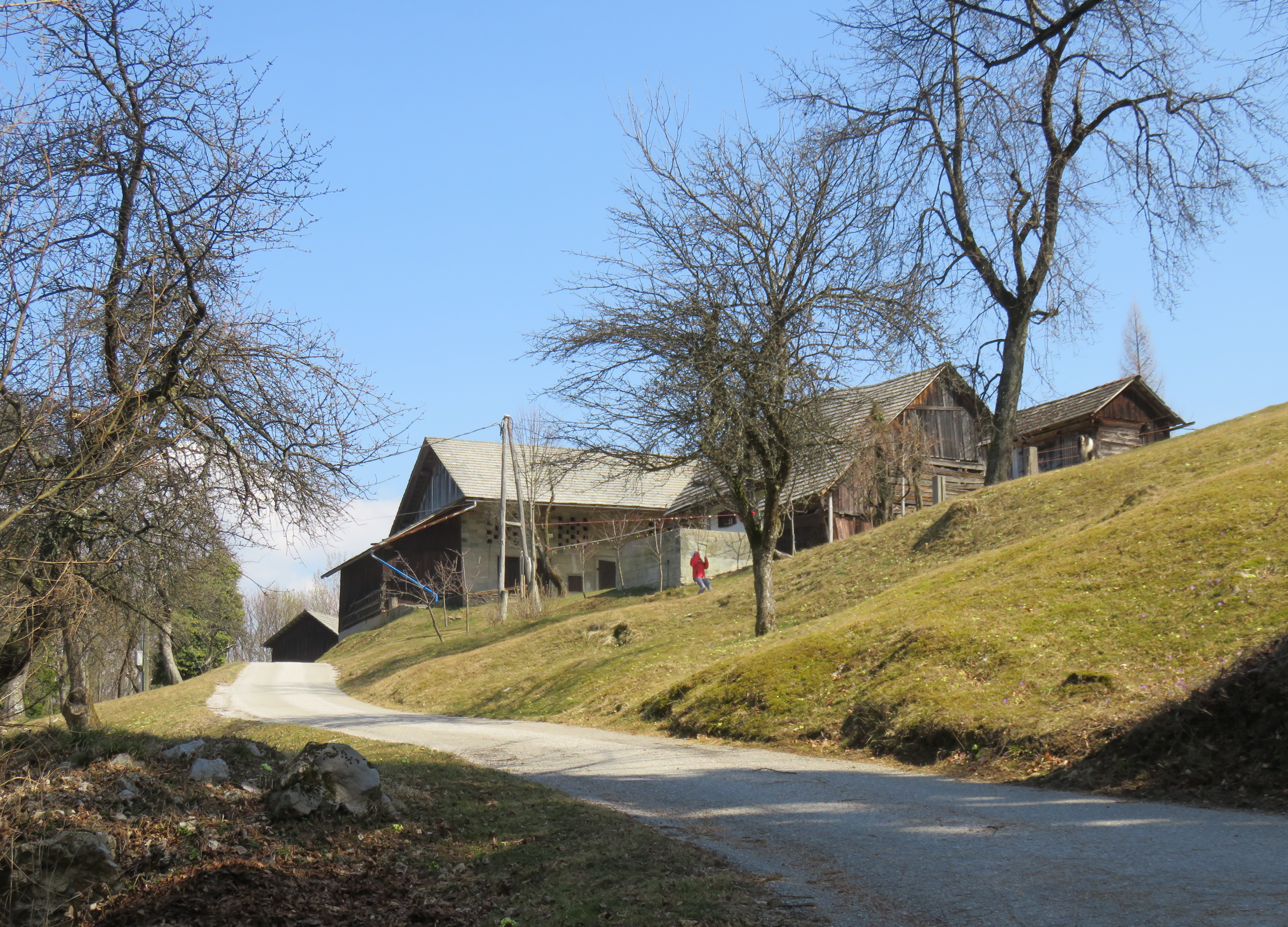

- Location in Slovenia
- Coordinates: 46°7′15″N 14°44′19″E
- Country: Slovenia
- Traditional region: Upper Carniola
- Statistical region: Central Slovenia
- Municipality: Moravče
- Elevation: 490 m (1,610 ft)

Klen (Slovene pronunciation: [ˈkleːn]) is a former settlement in the Municipality of Moravče in central Slovenia. It is now part of the village of Češnjice pri Moravčah. The area is part of the traditional region of Upper Carniola. The municipality is now included in the Central Slovenia Statistical Region.

== Geography ==
Klen lies in the western part of Češnjice pri Moravčah, southwest of the main settlement.

== History ==
Klen had a population of four living in one house in 1900. Klen was annexed by Češnjice pri Moravčah in 1952, ending its existence as an independent settlement.
