= Brinje (disambiguation) =

Brinje is a municipality in Lika-Senj County, Croatia.

Brinje may also refer to:

- Brinje, Dol pri Ljubljani, a settlement in Upper Carniola, Slovenia
- Brinje, Moravče a former settlement in Drtija, Slovenia
- Brinje, Šentrupert, a settlement in Lower Carniola, Slovenia
