= Pristava, Moravče =

Pristava
- Location in Slovenia
- Coordinates: 46°9′39″N 14°46′46″E
- Country: Slovenia
- Traditional region: Upper Carniola
- Statistical region: Central Slovenia
- Municipality: Moravče
- Elevation: 723 m (2,372 ft)

Pristava (Slovene pronunciation: [pɾiˈstaːʋa]) is a former settlement in the Municipality of Moravče in central Slovenia. It is now part of the village of Limbarska Gora. The area is part of the traditional region of Upper Carniola. The municipality is now included in the Central Slovenia Statistical Region.

== Geography ==
Pristava lies in the northeast part of the village of Limbarska Gora, near the crest of the hill ascending to the main settlement.

== History ==
Pristava had a population of 23 living in three houses in 1900. Pristava was annexed by Limbarska Gora (at that time still called Sveti Valentin) in 1952, ending its existence as an independent settlement.
