= Belnek =

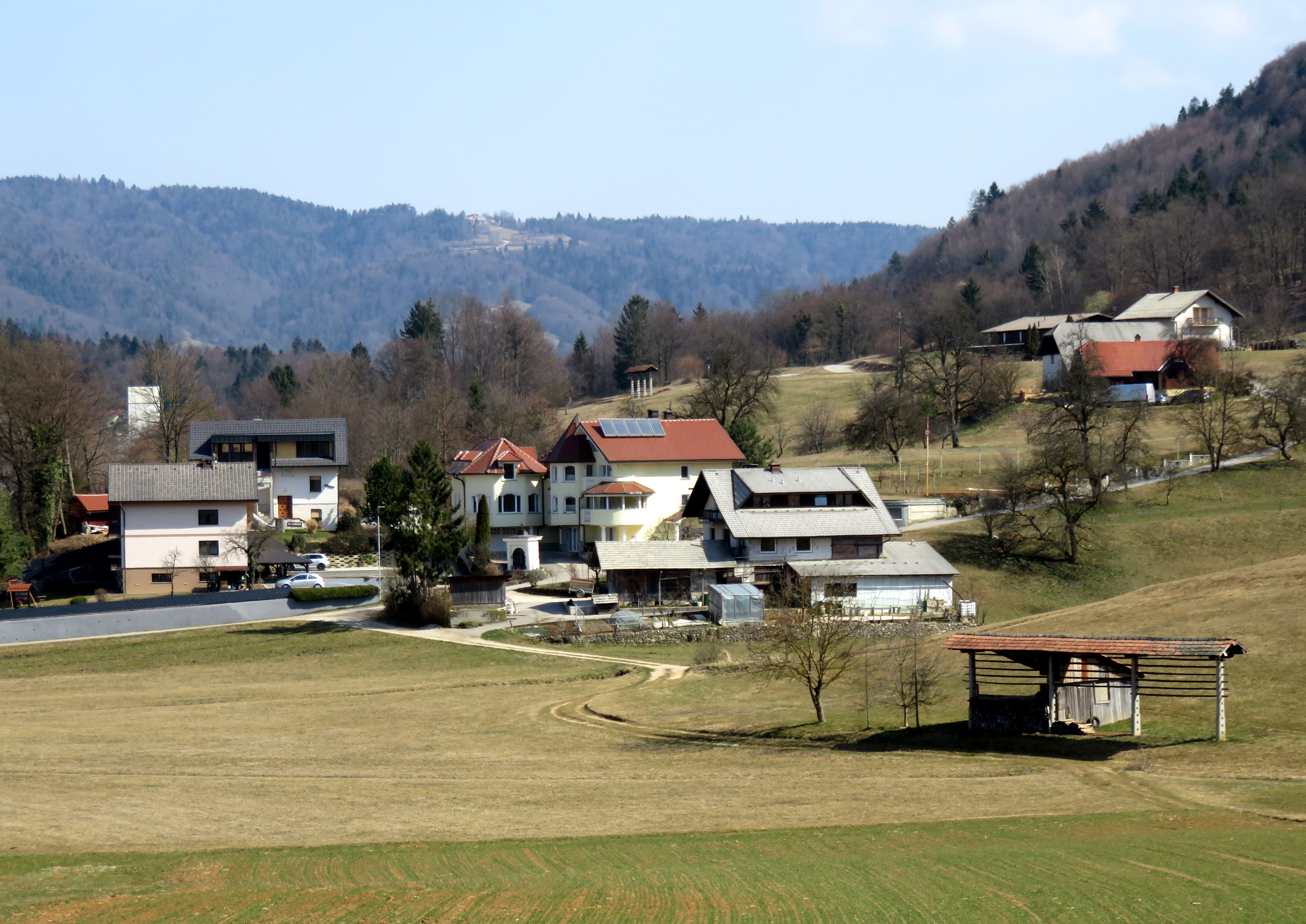

- Location in Slovenia
- Coordinates: 46°7′34″N 14°45′47″E
- Country: Slovenia
- Traditional region: Upper Carniola
- Statistical region: Central Slovenia
- Municipality: Moravče
- Elevation: 394 m (1,293 ft)

Belnek (pronounced [bɛlˈnɛk], in some sources also Belnik, German: Wildenegg) is a former settlement in the Municipality of Moravče in central Slovenia. It is now part of the village of Drtija. The area is part of the traditional region of Upper Carniola. The municipality is now included in the Central Slovenia Statistical Region.

== Geography ==
Belnek lies in the central part of the village of Drtija, south of the main part of the settlement and below the north slope of Gorišca Hill (elevation: 698 meters or 2,290 feet).

== Belnek Castle ==
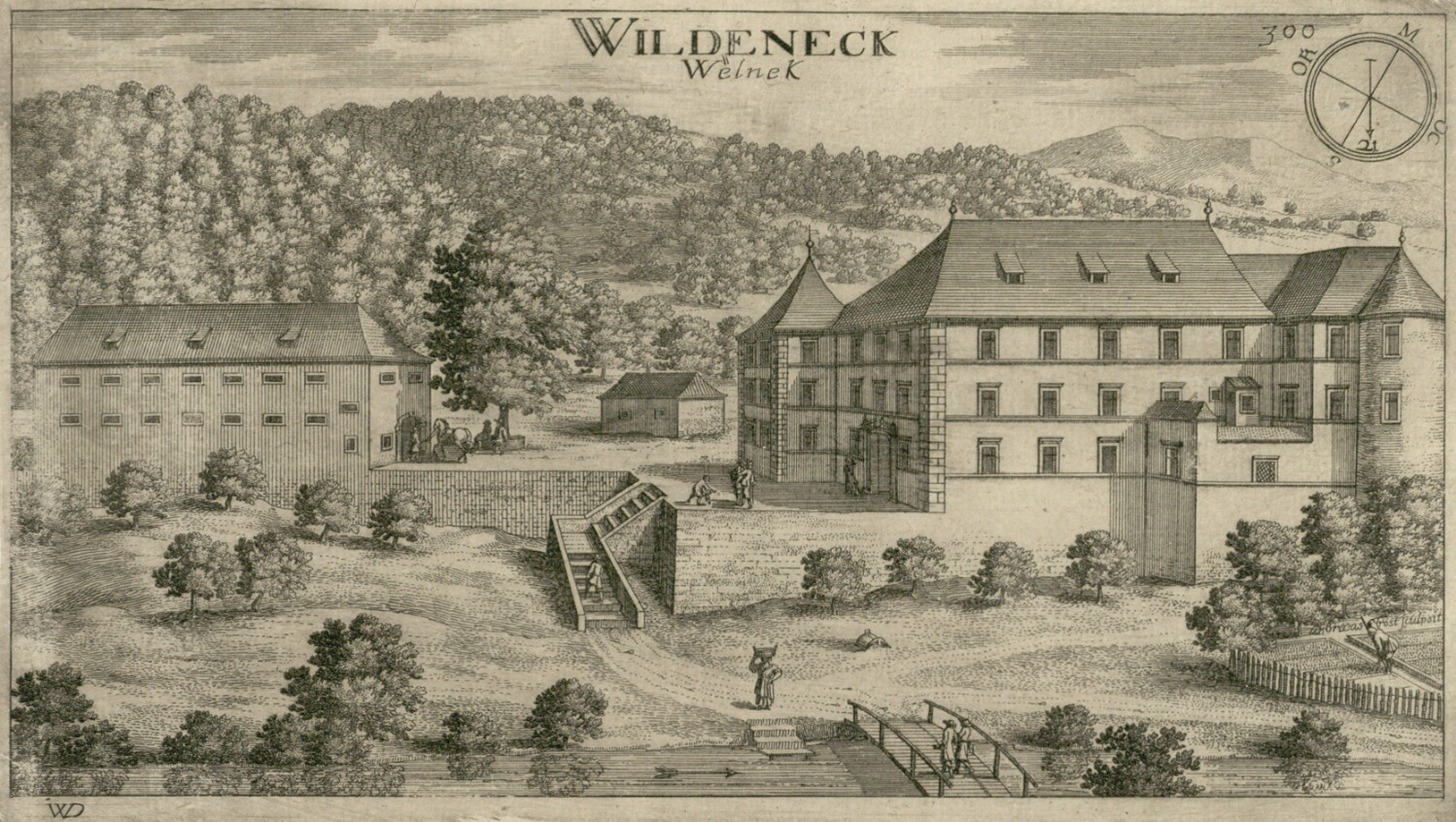
Belnek Castle in the 17th century

Belnek Castle (German: Wildeneck, Wildenegg) stood on a low rise near the village. It was first mentioned in written sources in 1390 as Wildenech and was built by the knights of Lilienberg from Limbarska Gora. Frederick II, Count of Celje granted the castle to Erasmus Laaser in 1449, and in 1512 ownership was assumed by Georg Laaser. During the Counter-Reformation the Protestant preacher Primož Trubar and his son Felicijan withdrew to the castle. The castle was plundered during a peasant uprising in 1635. The castle had a series of owners until the mid-17th century, when the original structure was reworked into a three-story building with towers. The well-preserved castle was purchased from its local owner, Ignac Klopčič, by Baron Minutillo in 1901. The last owner was his daughter Elisabeth Daublebsky-Eichheim (née Minutillo) from Graz, who inherited the castle during the Second World War. On 15 July 1944 a Partisan unit commanded by Mile Kilibarda burned the castle. German forces made the local people try to put out the fire, but without success. After the fire, the Partisans organized a rally and party at the site of the burned castle. A Partisan weapons factory was set up in the ruins of the castle cellar in August 1944. The ruins of the castle were razed after the war and new housing was built at the site. The building stones of the castle were taken away by the locals, who used them to repair their houses. The stone plaque from the castle, engraved with a crest, inscription, and the year 1660, is now built into a house in Zgornja Dobrava.

== History ==
Belnek had a population of 18 living in five houses in 1900. Belnek was annexed by Drtija in 1952, ending its existence as an independent settlement. It corresponds to the hamlet of Perovc today.
