= Učak, Moravče =

Učak
- Location in Slovenia
- Coordinates: 46°8′37″N 14°45′17″E
- Country: Slovenia
- Traditional region: Upper Carniola
- Statistical region: Central Slovenia
- Municipality: Moravče
- Elevation: 410 m (1,350 ft)

Učak (Slovene pronunciation: [uˈtʃaːk], in older sources Utčak) is a former settlement in the Municipality of Moravče in central Slovenia. It is now part of the village of Zalog pri Moravčah. The area is part of the traditional region of Upper Carniola. The municipality is now included in the Central Slovenia Statistical Region.

== Geography ==
Učak lies in a wooded area north of Zalog pri Moravčah.

== History ==
Učak had a population of six living in one house in 1900. Učak was annexed by Zalog pri Moravčah in 1952, ending its existence as an independent settlement.
