= Vodice, Moravče =

Vodice
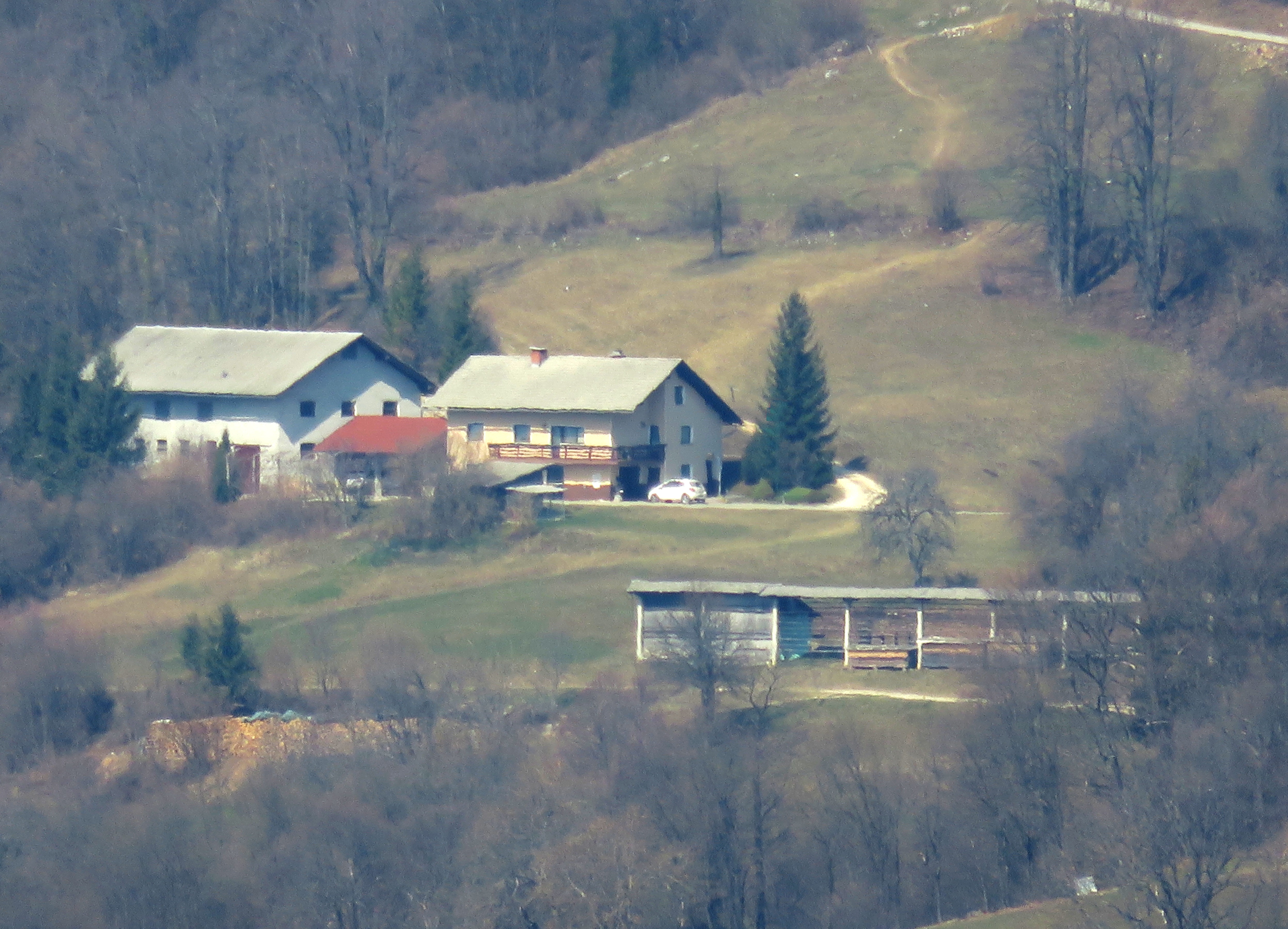

- Location in Slovenia
- Coordinates: 46°9′18″N 14°46′16″E
- Country: Slovenia
- Traditional region: Upper Carniola
- Statistical region: Central Slovenia
- Municipality: Moravče
- Elevation: 626 m (2,054 ft)

Vodice (Slovene pronunciation: [ʋɔˈdiːtsɛ], German: Woditz) is a former settlement in the Municipality of Moravče in central Slovenia. It is now part of the village of Limbarska Gora. The area is part of the traditional region of Upper Carniola. The municipality is now included in the Central Slovenia Statistical Region.

== Geography ==
Vodice lies in the central part of the village of Limbarska Gora, on the south slope of the hill ascending to the main settlement.

== History ==
Vodice had a population of 48 living in six houses in 1900. Vodice was annexed by Limbarska Gora (at that time still called Sveti Valentin) in 1952, ending its existence as an independent settlement.
