= Hruške =

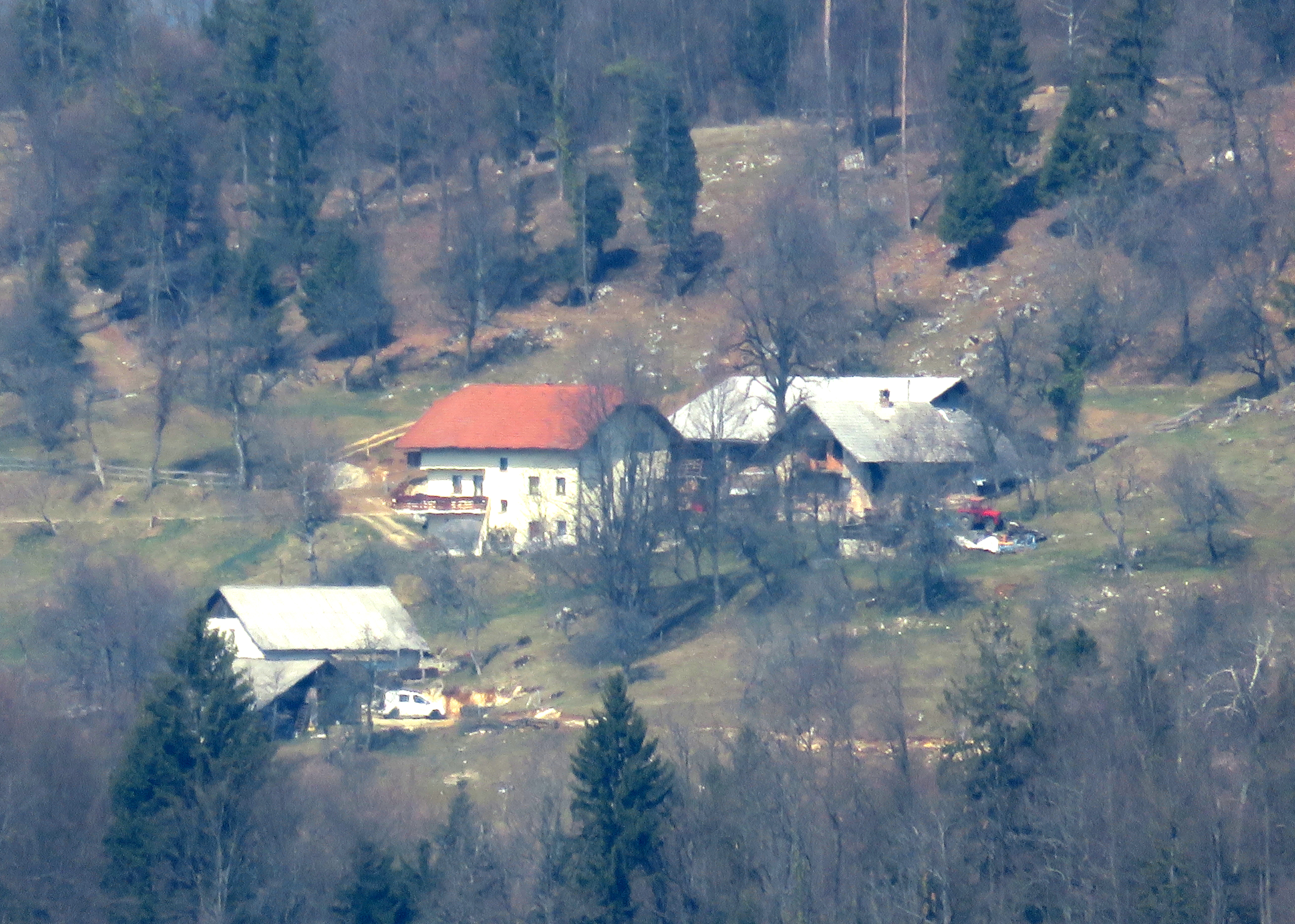

- Location in Slovenia
- Coordinates: 46°9′24″N 14°46′22″E
- Country: Slovenia
- Traditional region: Upper Carniola
- Statistical region: Central Slovenia
- Municipality: Moravče
- Elevation: 675 m (2,215 ft)

Hruške (Slovene pronunciation: [ˈxɾuːʃkɛ]) is a former settlement in the Municipality of Moravče in central Slovenia. It is now part of the village of Limbarska Gora. The area is part of the traditional region of Upper Carniola. The municipality is now included in the Central Slovenia Statistical Region.

== Geography ==
Hruške lies in the central part of the village of Limbarska Gora, below the south slope of the hill ascending to the main settlement.

== History ==
Hruške had a population of 20 living in four houses in 1900. Hruške was annexed by Limbarska Gora (at that time still called Sveti Valentin) in 1952, ending its existence as an independent settlement.
