= Zore, Moravče =

Zore
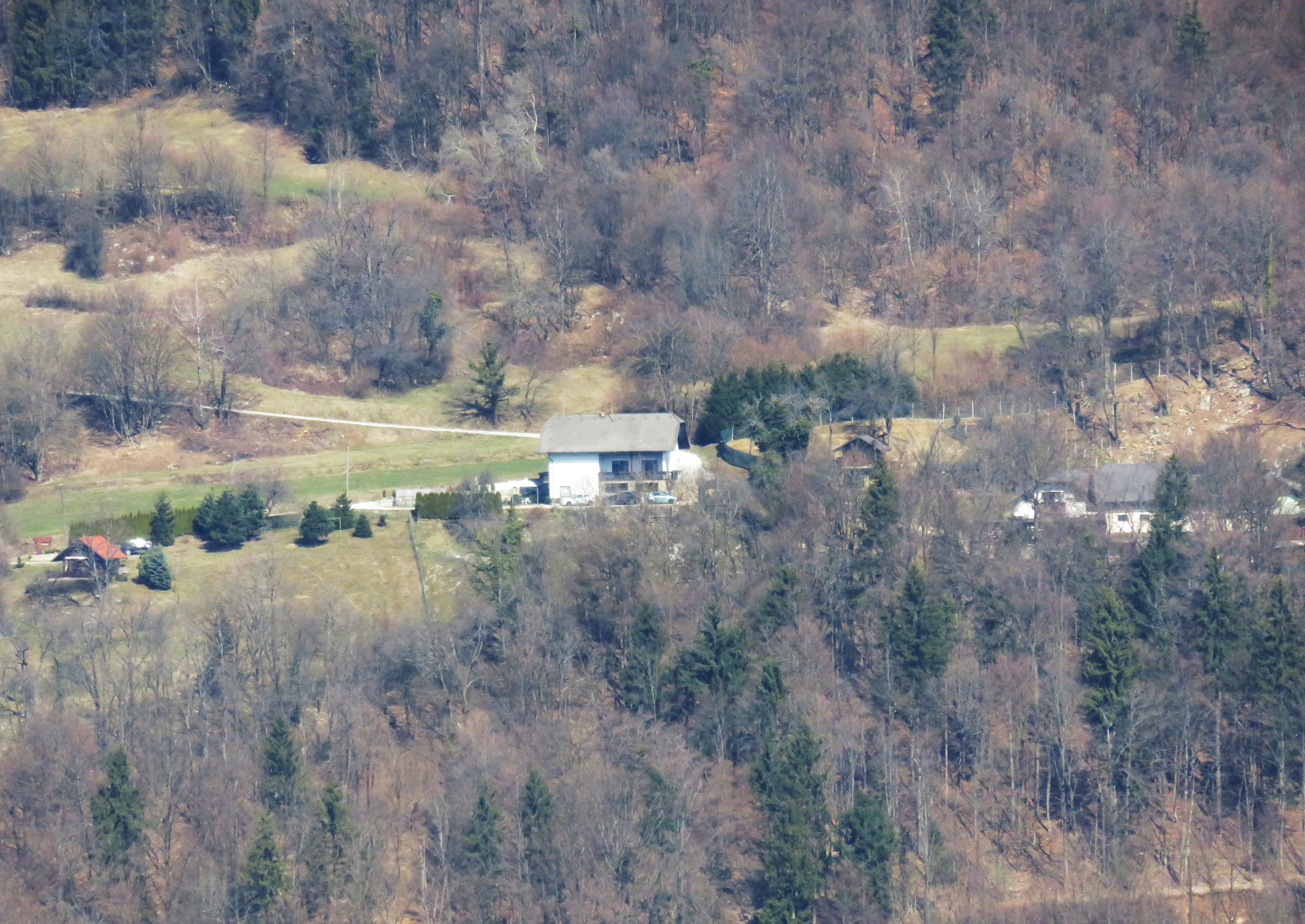

- Location in Slovenia
- Coordinates: 46°8′59″N 14°46′35″E
- Country: Slovenia
- Traditional region: Upper Carniola
- Statistical region: Central Slovenia
- Municipality: Moravče
- Elevation: 520 m (1,710 ft)

Zore (Slovene pronunciation: [ˈzɔːɾɛ], in older sources also Zori) is a former settlement in the Municipality of Moravče in central Slovenia. It is now part of the village of Limbarska Gora. The area is part of the traditional region of Upper Carniola. The municipality is now included in the Central Slovenia Statistical Region.

== Geography ==
Zore lies in the southern part of the village of Limbarska Gora, below the south slope of the hill ascending to the main settlement.

== History ==
Zore had a population of 17 living in three houses in 1900. Zore was annexed by Limbarska Gora (at that time still called Sveti Valentin) in 1952, ending its existence as an independent settlement.
