= Zapleš =

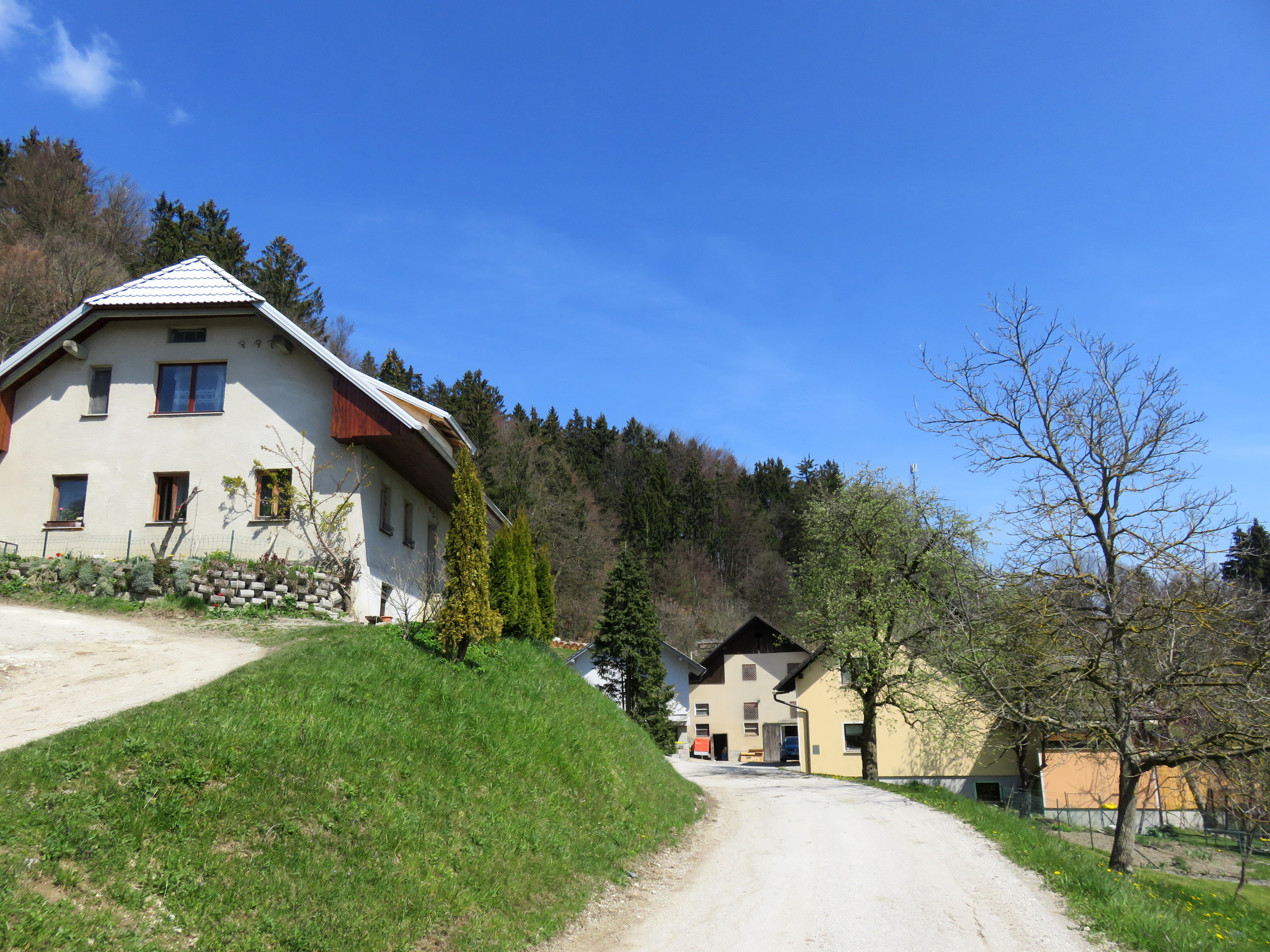

- Location in Slovenia
- Coordinates: 46°09′54″N 14°40′53″E
- Country: Slovenia
- Traditional region: Upper Carniola
- Statistical region: Central Slovenia
- Municipality: Lukovica
- Elevation: 680 m (2,230 ft)

Zapleš (pronounced [zaˈpleːʃ], German: Saplesch) is a former village in central Slovenia in the Municipality of Lukovica. It is now part of the village of Hribi. It is part of the traditional region of Upper Carniola and is now included in the Central Slovenia Statistical Region.

== Geography ==
Zapleš is a small hillside settlement on the sunny slope of Kamnec Hill (elevation: 862 meters or 2,828 feet). It lies north of the main hamlet in Hribi.

== Name ==
Zapleš is recorded in older sources in Slovene as Sapleſh and Za Plešjo, and in German as Saplesch and Plesch. The name may refer to bare, unplowed land between fields or similar terrain, related to names like Pleš, Pleša, and Plešivica, which derive from the common noun pleša 'bare land', especially in a mountain area.

== History ==
Zapleš had a population of 25 (in three houses) in 1900, 21 (in three houses) in 1931, and 22 (in four houses) in 1953. Zapleš was annexed by Hribi in 1953, ending its existence as a separate settlement.
