= Gorica, Drtija =

Gorica
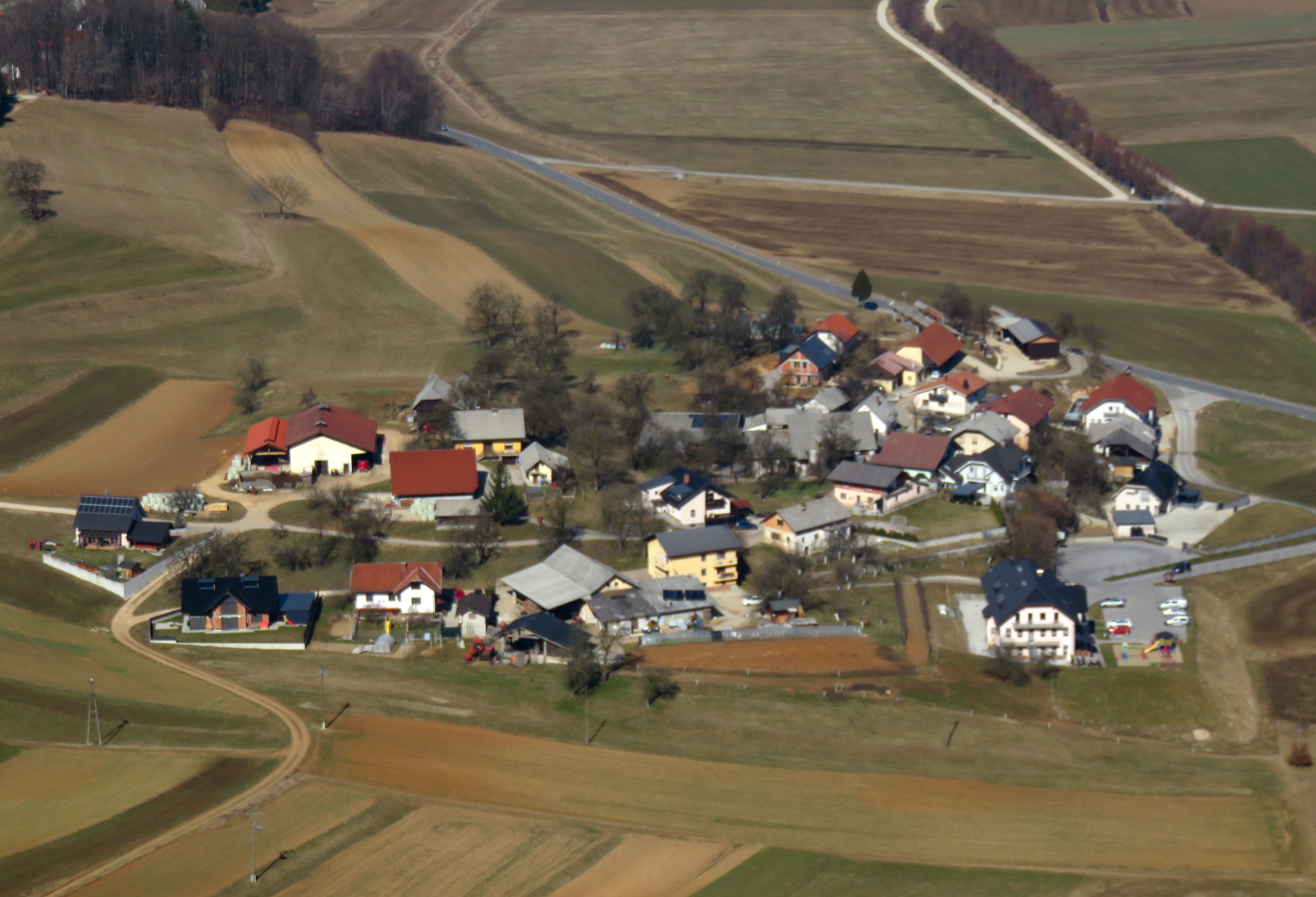

- Location in Slovenia
- Coordinates: 46°7′33″N 14°45′30″E
- Country: Slovenia
- Traditional region: Upper Carniola
- Statistical region: Central Slovenia
- Municipality: Moravče
- Elevation: 390 m (1,280 ft)

Gorica (pronounced [ɡɔˈɾiːtsa]) is a former settlement in the Municipality of Moravče in central Slovenia. It is now part of the village of Drtija. The area is part of the traditional region of Upper Carniola. The municipality is now included in the Central Slovenia Statistical Region.

== Geography ==
Gorica lies in the western part of the village of Drtija, below the Grmače Pass, which connects the Sava Valley with the Moravče Valley.

== History ==
Gorica is among the comparatively older settlements in the area. In 1880, Gorica had a population of 25 living in four houses. Gorica was annexed by Drtija in 1952, ending its existence as an independent settlement.
