= Stephen S. Kudla =

Venezuelan American mathematician

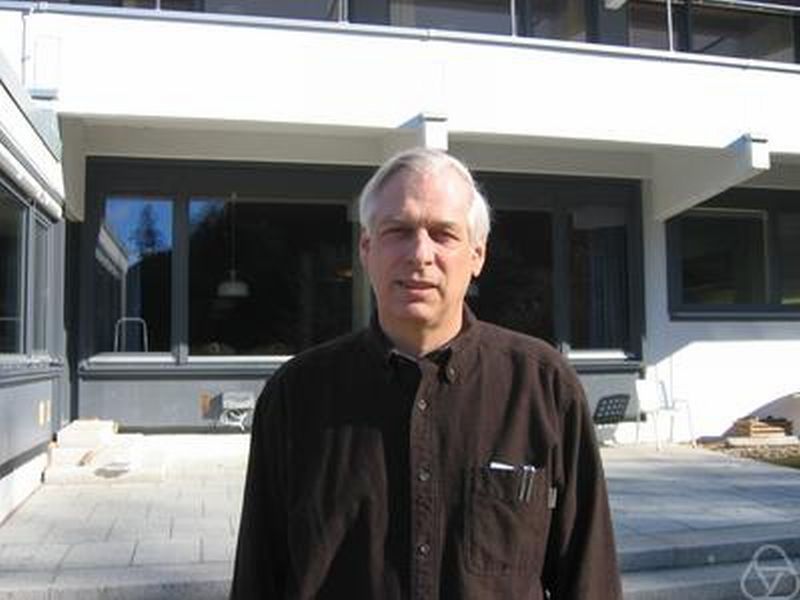
- Oberwolfach, 2008
- Born: 1950 (age 75–76); Caracas, Venezuela
- Education: Harvard University
- Known for: Kudla Program
- Awards: Sloan Fellow; Max-Planck Research Award; Jeffery–Williams Prize
- Scientific career
- Fields: Mathematics
- Workplaces: University of Maryland, College Park; University of Toronto
- Doctoral advisor: Michio Kuga

Stephen S. Kudla FRSC (born 1950 Caracas, Venezuela) is an American mathematician working in arithmetic geometry and automorphic forms. He is a professor in the Department of Mathematics at the University of Toronto.

== Life ==
After receiving his doctorate, Kudla spent a year at the Institute for Advanced Study in Princeton, following which he joined the faculty at the University of Maryland, College Park. Since 2006, he has been a professor at the University of Toronto where he held a Canada Research Chair for the period 2006–2020.

In 1997, he discovered relationships between the Fourier coefficients of derivatives of Siegel Eisenstein series and arithmetic invariants of Shimura varieties (heights pairings of arithmetic cycles).

He was a Sloan Fellow in 1981, received the Max-Planck Research Award in 2000, and the Jeffery–Williams Prize of the Canadian Mathematical Society in 2009. He was an Invited Speaker at the 2002 International Congress of Mathematicians in Beijing, where he gave a lecture on "Derivatives of Eisenstein series and arithmetic geometry". He was on the Scientific Review Panel of the Pacific Institute for the Mathematical Sciences (PIMS) for the period 2009–2013. For 2004 - 2010, he was a co-editor of the Canadian Journal of Mathematics, and has been co-organizer of several conferences at the Mathematical Research Institute of Oberwolfach.

== Education ==
- Ph.D. State University of New York at Stony Brook 1975; Dissertation: Real Points on Algebraic Varieties Defined by Quaternion Algebras. Advisor: Michio Kuga.

== Selected publications ==
- with Michael Rapoport, T. Yang: Modular forms and special cycles on Shimura curves. In: Annals of Mathematics Studies. 161. Princeton University Press, Princeton, NJ, 2006. x+373 pages ISBN 0-691-12551-1 MR 2220359
