= Lebenice =

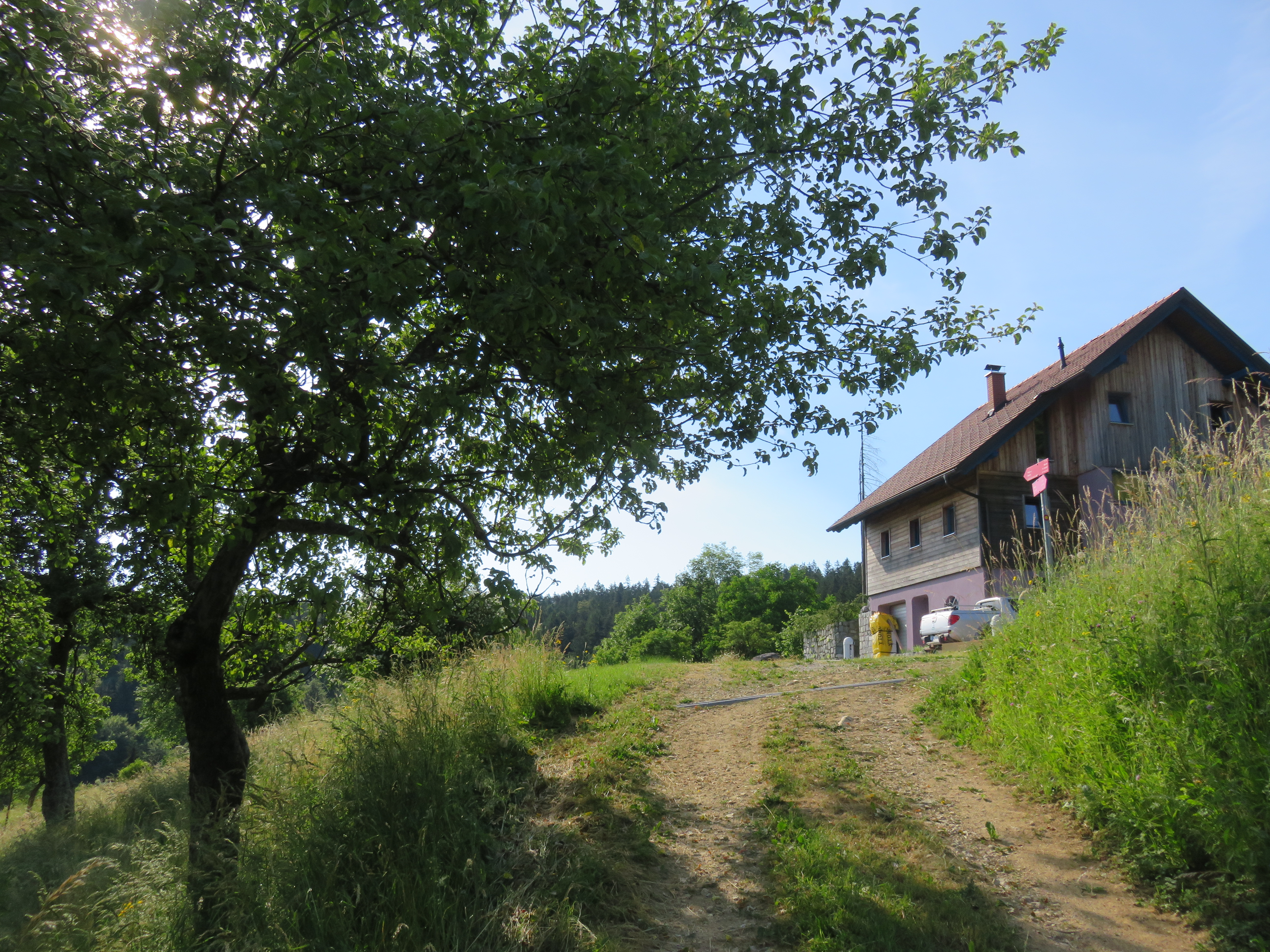

- Location in Slovenia
- Coordinates: 46°12′12″N 14°53′04″E
- Country: Slovenia
- Traditional region: Upper Carniola
- Statistical region: Central Slovenia
- Municipality: Lukovica
- Elevation: 740 m (2,430 ft)

Lebenice (pronounced [lɛbɛˈniːtsɛ], German: Lebeniza) is a former village in central Slovenia in the Municipality of Lukovica. It is now part of the village of Hribi. It is part of the traditional region of Upper Carniola and is now included in the Central Slovenia Statistical Region.

== Geography ==
Lebenice is a small high-elevation settlement on the northern slope of Kamnec Hill (elevation: 862 meters or 2,828 feet) above Motnik. It lies north-northwest of the main hamlet in Hribi.

== Name ==
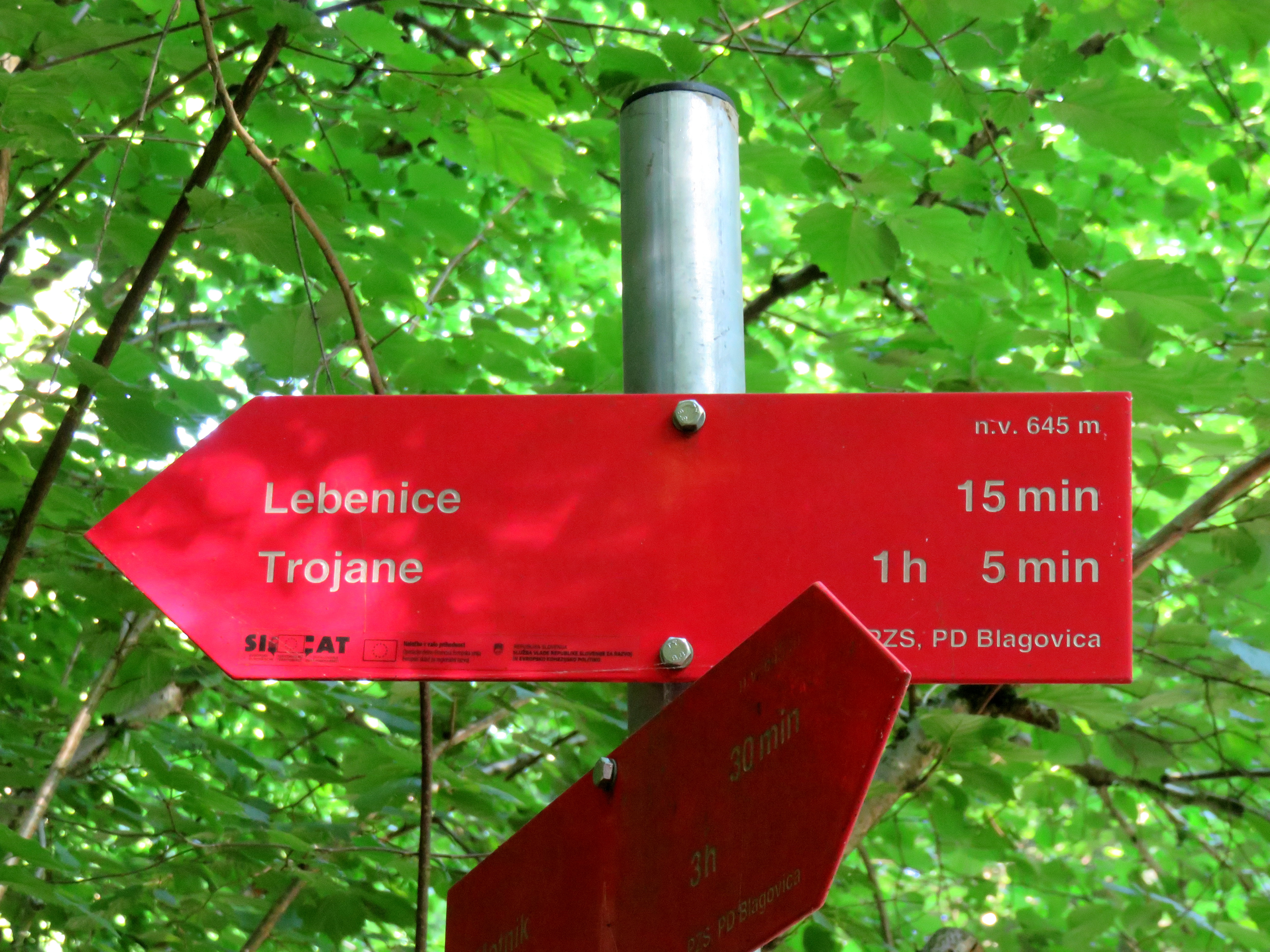
Hiking sign for Lebenice

Lebenice appears in older sources in Slovene as Lebenize and Levenice. It was recorded in German as Lubenzach in 1571, Leboniza in 1763–1787, and Lebeniza in 1857.

== History ==
Lebenice had a population of 12 (in three houses) in 1880, 17 (in three houses) in 1900, 11 (in two houses) in 1931, and three (in one house) in 1953. Lebenice was annexed by Hribi in 1953, ending its existence as a separate settlement.
