= Brinje, Moravče =

Brinje
- Location in Slovenia
- Coordinates: 46°8′2″N 14°45′19″E
- Country: Slovenia
- Traditional region: Upper Carniola
- Statistical region: Central Slovenia
- Municipality: Moravče
- Elevation: 380 m (1,250 ft)

Brinje (Slovene pronunciation: [ˈbɾiːnjɛ]) is a former settlement in the Municipality of Moravče in central Slovenia. It is now part of the village of Drtija. The area is part of the traditional region of Upper Carniola. The municipality is now included in the Central Slovenia Statistical Region.

== Geography ==
Brinje lies in the northwestern part of the village of Drtija, in a low area north of Stražca Creek. The buildings in the former settlement are administratively part of the neighboring settlement of Zalog pri Moravčah.

== History ==
Brinje had a population of six living in one house in 1900. Brinje was annexed by Drtija in 1952, ending its existence as an independent settlement.
