= Štance Laze =

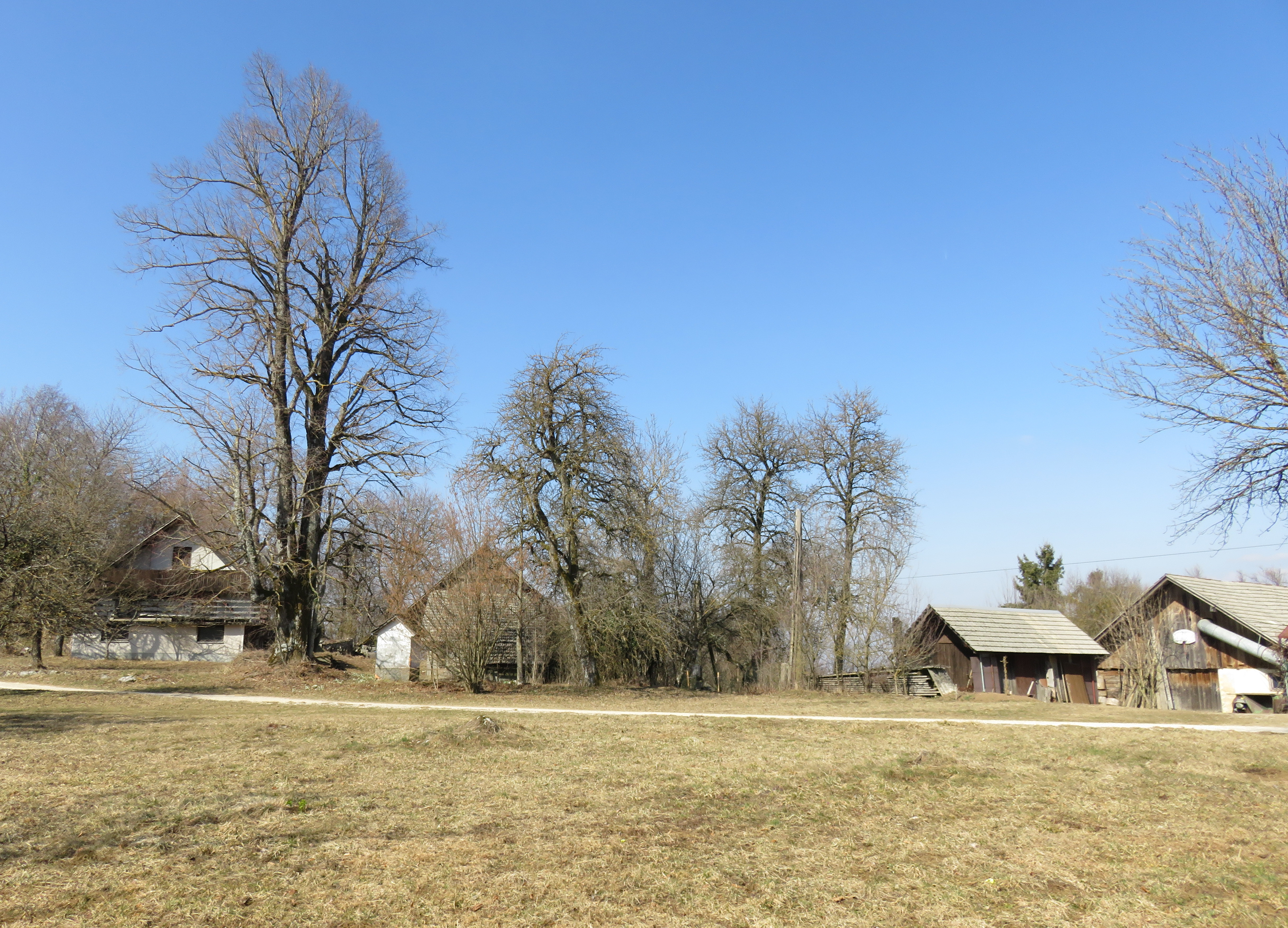

- Location in Slovenia
- Coordinates: 46°7′29″N 14°47′03″E
- Country: Slovenia
- Traditional region: Upper Carniola
- Statistical region: Central Slovenia
- Municipality: Moravče
- Elevation: 773 m (2,536 ft)

Štance Laze (pronounced [ˈʃtaːntsɛ ˈlaːzɛ], also known as Štance or Laze) is a former settlement in the Municipality of Moravče in central Slovenia. It is now part of the village of Drtija. The area is part of the traditional region of Upper Carniola. The municipality is now included in the Central Slovenia Statistical Region.

== Geography ==
Štance Laze lies in the far eastern part of the village of Drtija, on the southwestern slope of Kilovec Hill (elevation: 800 meters or 2,600 feet).

== History ==
In 1900, Štance Laze had a population of 22 living in three houses. Štance Laze was annexed by Drtija in 1952, ending its existence as an independent settlement.
