= Štorovje, Moravče =

Štorovje
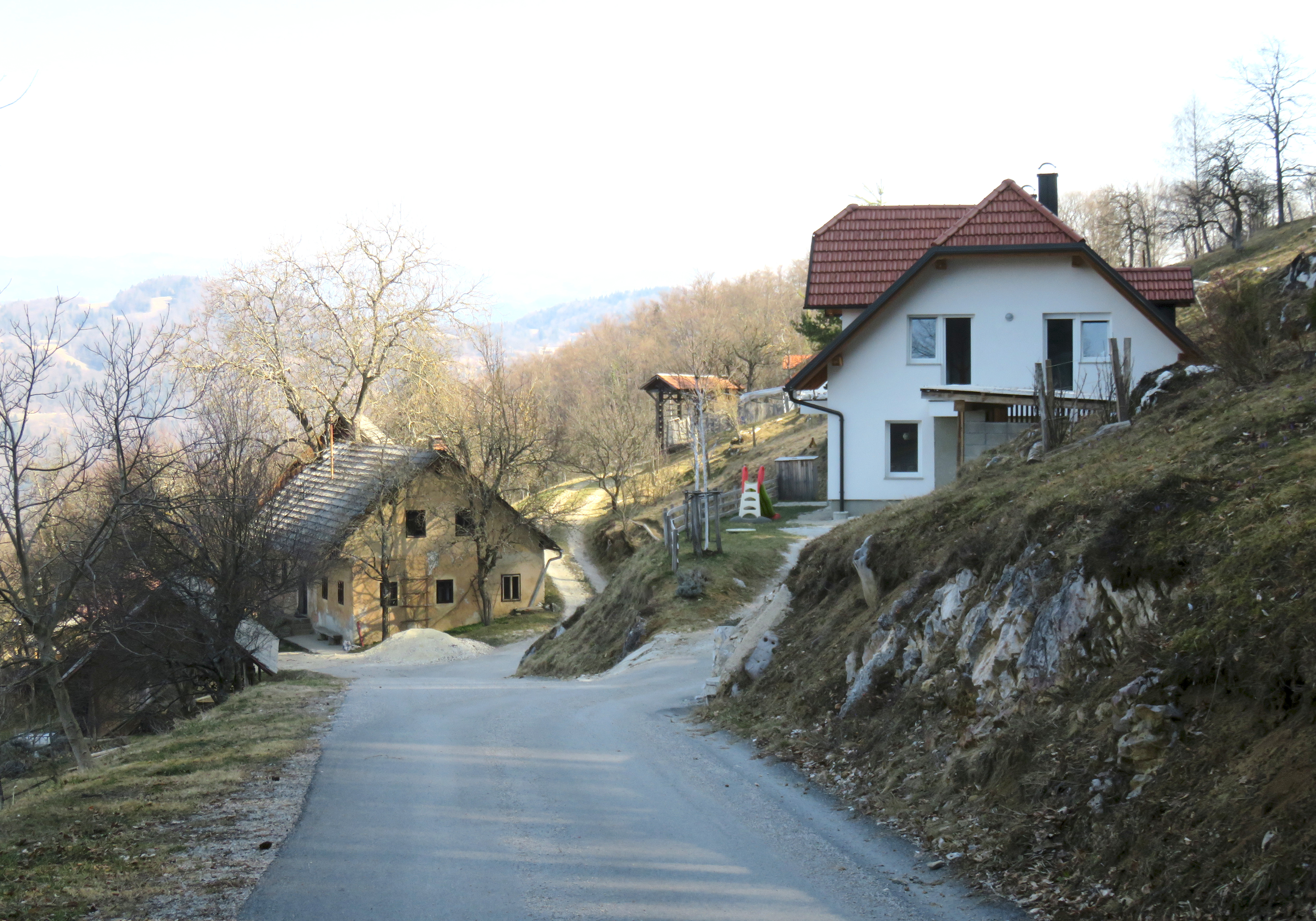

- Location in Slovenia
- Coordinates: 46°7′33″N 14°46′23″E
- Country: Slovenia
- Traditional region: Upper Carniola
- Statistical region: Central Slovenia
- Municipality: Moravče
- Elevation: 561 m (1,841 ft)

Štorovje (Slovene pronunciation: [ˈʃtoːɾɔʋjɛ]) is a former settlement in the Municipality of Moravče in central Slovenia. It is now part of the village of Drtija. The area is part of the traditional region of Upper Carniola. The municipality is now included in the Central Slovenia Statistical Region.

== Geography ==
Štorovje lies southeast of the main part of the village of Drtija, below the Slivna Ridge.

== History ==
Štorovje is among the comparatively more recent settlements in the area. Štorovje had a population of seven living in two houses in 1900. Štorovje was annexed by Drtija in 1952, ending its existence as an independent settlement.
