= Vahtenberk =

- Location in Slovenia
- Coordinates: 46°8′28″N 14°45′43″E
- Country: Slovenia
- Traditional region: Upper Carniola
- Statistical region: Central Slovenia
- Municipality: Moravče
- Elevation: 434 m (1,424 ft)

Vahtenberk (Slovene pronunciation: [ˈʋaːxtɛnbɛɾk], German: Wachtenberg) is a former settlement in the Municipality of Moravče in central Slovenia. It is now part of the village of Zalog pri Moravčah. The area is part of the traditional region of Upper Carniola. The municipality is now included in the Central Slovenia Statistical Region.

== Geography ==
Vahtenberk lies in the eastern part of Zalog pri Moravčah, along both sides of the road to Gabrje pod Limbarsko Goro.

== History ==
Vahtenberk had a population of 15 living in three houses in 1880. Vahtenberk was annexed by Zalog pri Moravčah in 1952, ending its existence as an independent settlement.
