= Kovačija =

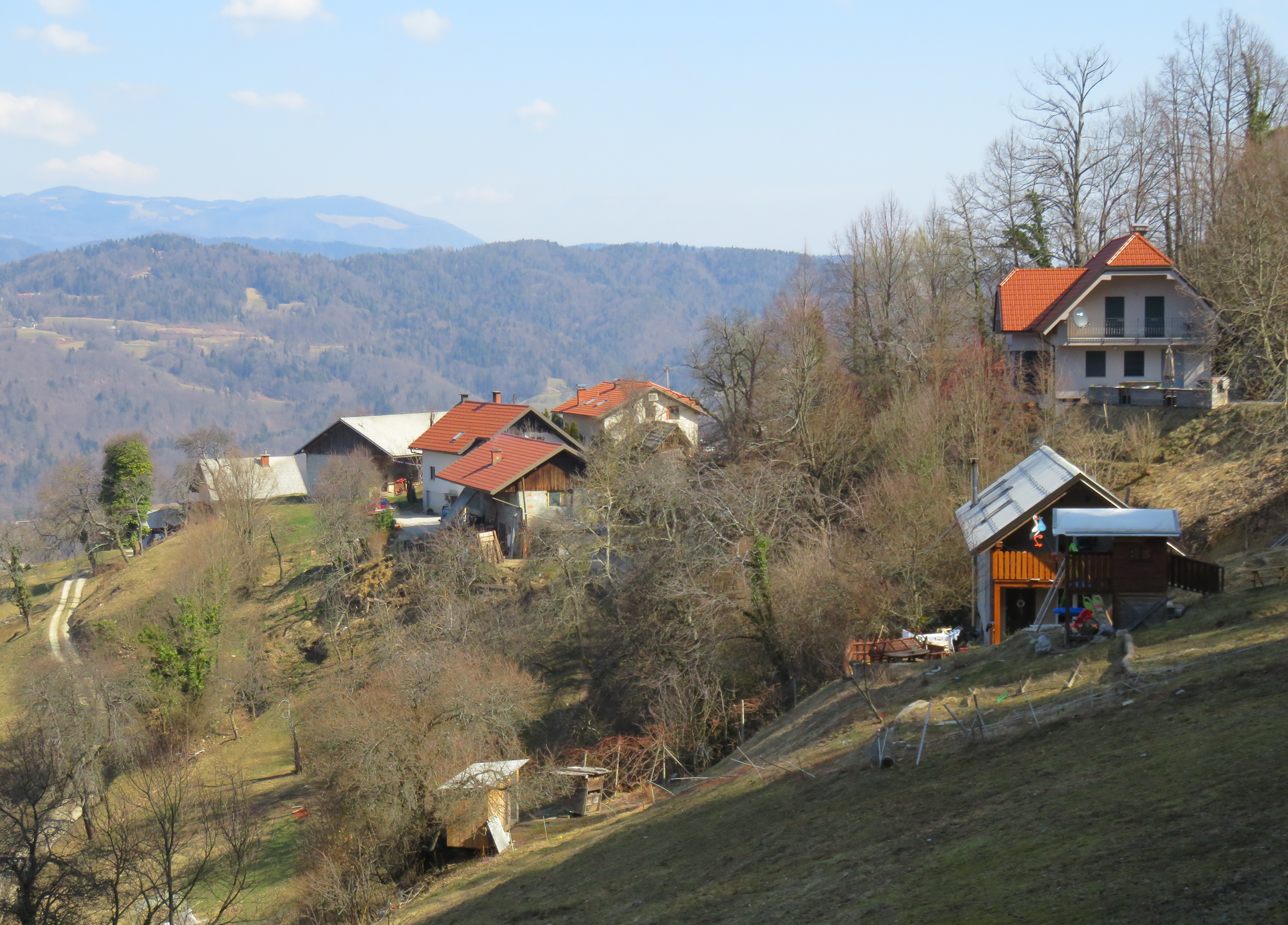

- Location in Slovenia
- Coordinates: 46°7′38″N 14°46′47″E
- Country: Slovenia
- Traditional region: Upper Carniola
- Statistical region: Central Slovenia
- Municipality: Moravče
- Elevation: 610 m (2,000 ft)

Kovačija (pronounced [kɔʋaˈtʃiːja]) is a former settlement in the Municipality of Moravče in central Slovenia. It is now part of the village of Drtija. The area is part of the traditional region of Upper Carniola. The municipality is now included in the Central Slovenia Statistical Region.

== Geography ==
Kovačija lies in the eastern part of the village of Drtija, below the western slope of Kilovec Hill (elevation: 800 meters or 2,600 feet).

== History ==
Kovačija had a population of 19 living in two houses in 1900. Kovačija was annexed by Drtija in 1952, ending its existence as an independent settlement.
