= Štebalija =

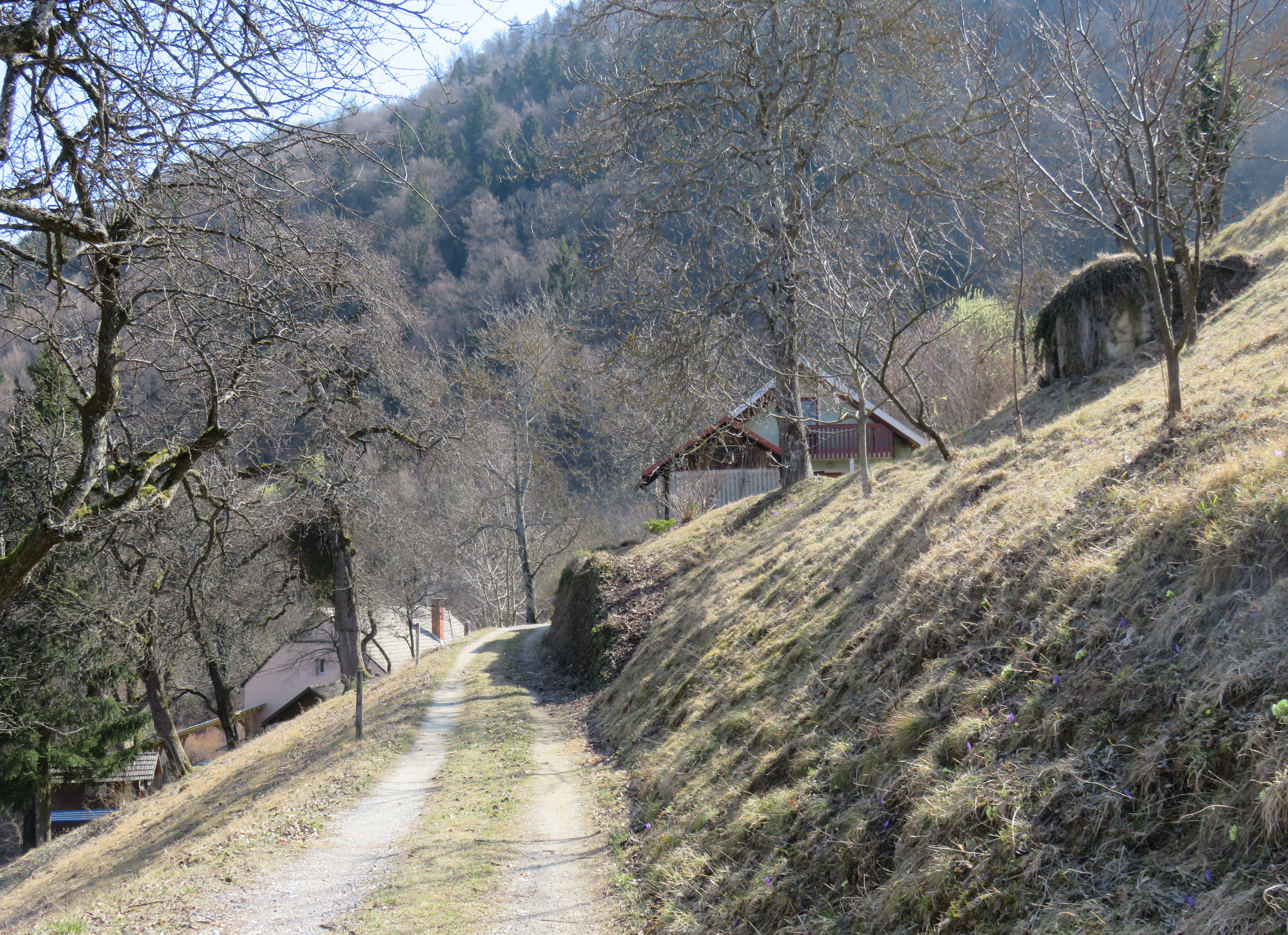

- Location in Slovenia
- Coordinates: 46°7′43″N 14°46′50″E
- Country: Slovenia
- Traditional region: Upper Carniola
- Statistical region: Central Slovenia
- Municipality: Moravče
- Elevation: 555 m (1,821 ft)

Štebalija (pronounced [ʃtɛbaˈliːja]) is a former settlement in the Municipality of Moravče in central Slovenia. It is now part of the village of Drtija. The area is part of the traditional region of Upper Carniola. The municipality is now included in the Central Slovenia Statistical Region.

== Geography ==
Štebalija lies in the eastern part of the village of Drtija, below the western slope of Kilovec Hill (elevation: 800 meters or 2,600 feet).

== History ==
Štebalija had a population of 12 living in two houses in 1900. Štebalija was annexed by Drtija in 1952, ending its existence as an independent settlement.
