= Drtno =

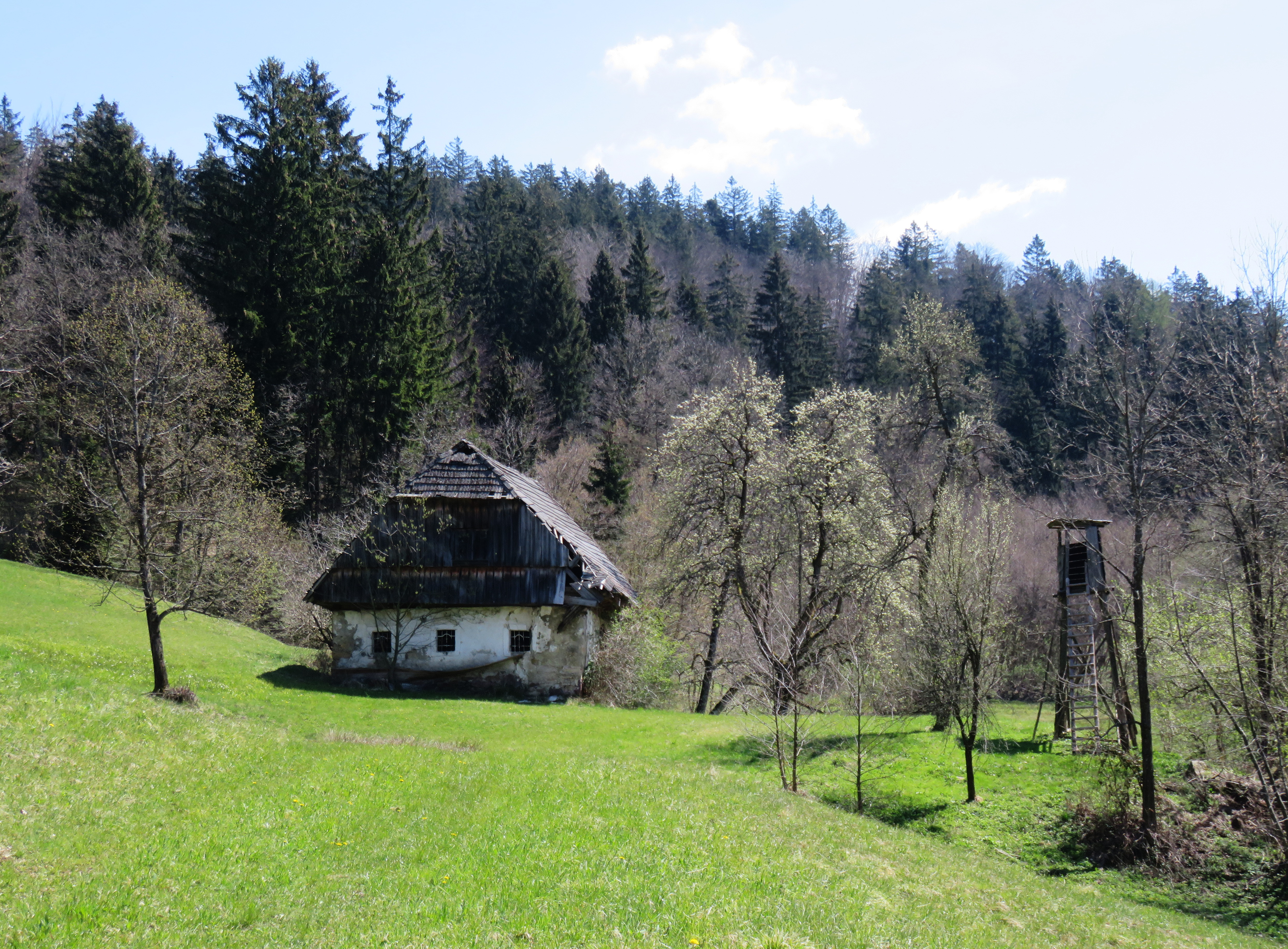

- Location in Slovenia
- Coordinates: 46°11′50″N 14°52′28″E
- Country: Slovenia
- Traditional region: Upper Carniola
- Statistical region: Central Slovenia
- Municipality: Lukovica
- Elevation: 630 m (2,070 ft)

Drtno (pronounced [ˈdəɾtnɔ], in older sources Dertno) is a former village in central Slovenia in the Municipality of Lukovica. It is now part of the village of Hribi. It is part of the traditional region of Upper Carniola and is now included in the Central Slovenia Statistical Region.

== Geography ==
Drtno is a small settlement along the upper course of the Bolska River. It lies northwest of the main hamlet in Hribi.

== Name ==
Drtno was attested in written sources as Odertnim in 1571, and in older modern sources it was spelled Dertno. The name is probably derived from Slavic *(orz-)dьrto(je) (poľe) 'cleared field', referring to land that was cleared for farming. Related toponyms include Drtija and Razdrto, as well as various microtoponyms (Drt, Drti, Drtica, Drtiči, Drtičje, Drtine, Drtniki).

== History ==
Drtno had a population of nine (in two houses) in 1900, six (in one house) in 1931, and nine (in two houses) in 1953. It has no residents today. Drtno was annexed by Hribi in 1953, ending its existence as a separate settlement.
