= Velika Raven, Lukovica =

Velika Raven
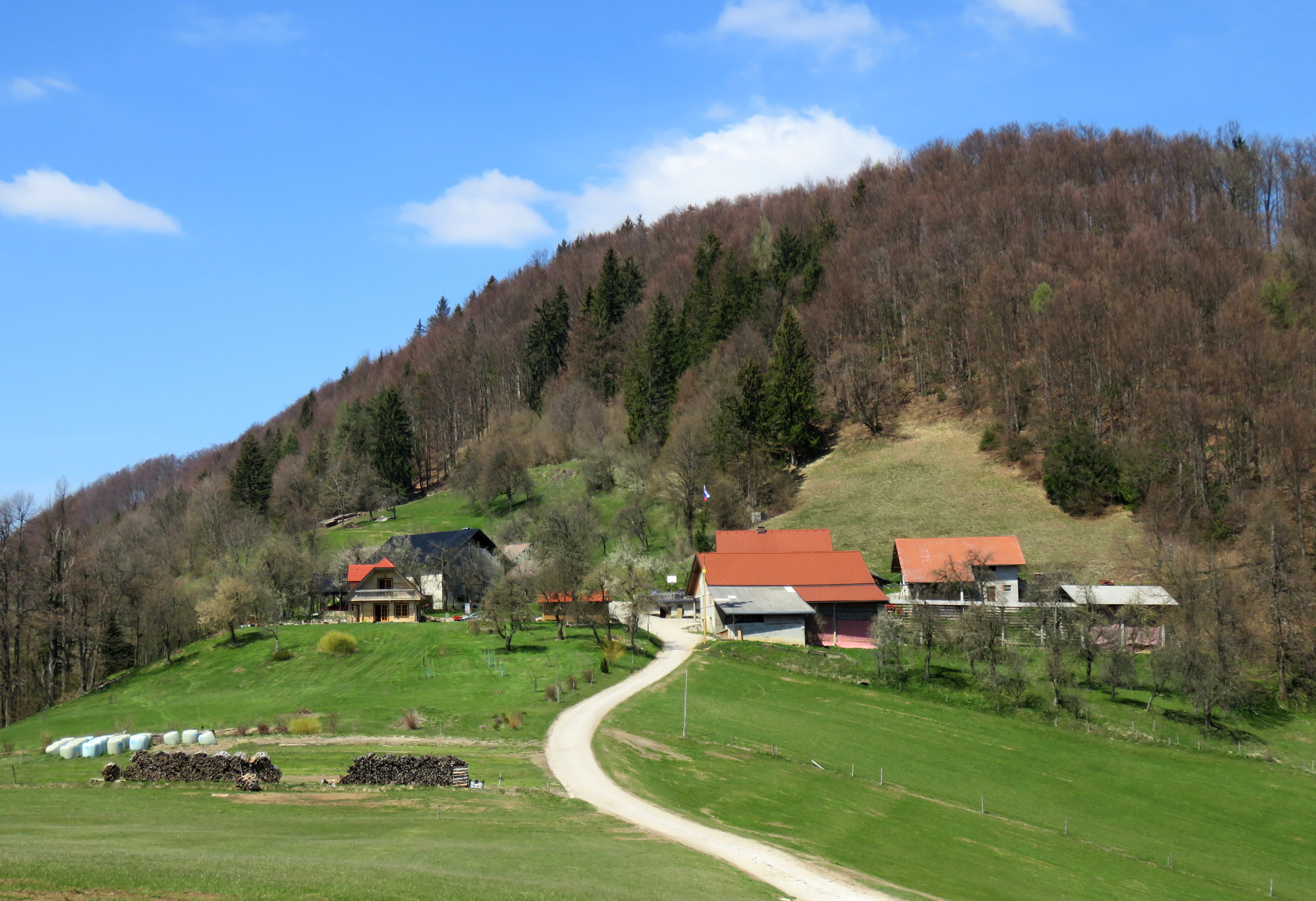

- Location in Slovenia
- Coordinates: 46°12′07″N 14°52′23″E
- Country: Slovenia
- Traditional region: Upper Carniola
- Statistical region: Central Slovenia
- Municipality: Lukovica
- Elevation: 800 m (2,600 ft)

Velika Raven (pronounced [ˈʋeːlika ˈɾaːʋən], locally [ˈʋeːlka ˈɾaːu̯n], also Veliki Raven, Velika Ravan, German: Welkaraun) is a former village in central Slovenia in the Municipality of Lukovica. It is now part of the village of Hribi. It is part of the traditional region of Upper Carniola and is now included in the Central Slovenia Statistical Region.

== Geography ==
Velika Raven is a small high-elevation settlement on the western slope of Kamnec Hill (elevation: 862 meters or 2,828 feet), on the watershed between the Bolska and Motnišnica rivers. It lies northwest of the main hamlet in Hribi.

== Name ==
Velika Raven is recorded in older sources in Slovene as Velika Rauna, Velke Ravne, Velka Ravan, and Velika Ravan, and in German as Welkaraun. The name literally means 'large flat area', referring to level terrain in hilly territory, from the common noun raven or ravan 'level area, plain', related to names such as Raven, Ravne, Ravnica, and Ravnace.

== History ==
Velika Raven had a population of 29 (in four houses) in 1900, 22 (in three houses) in 1931, and 25 (in four houses) in 1953. Velika Raven was annexed by Hribi in 1953, ending its existence as a separate settlement.
