= Kuga, Moravče =

Kuga
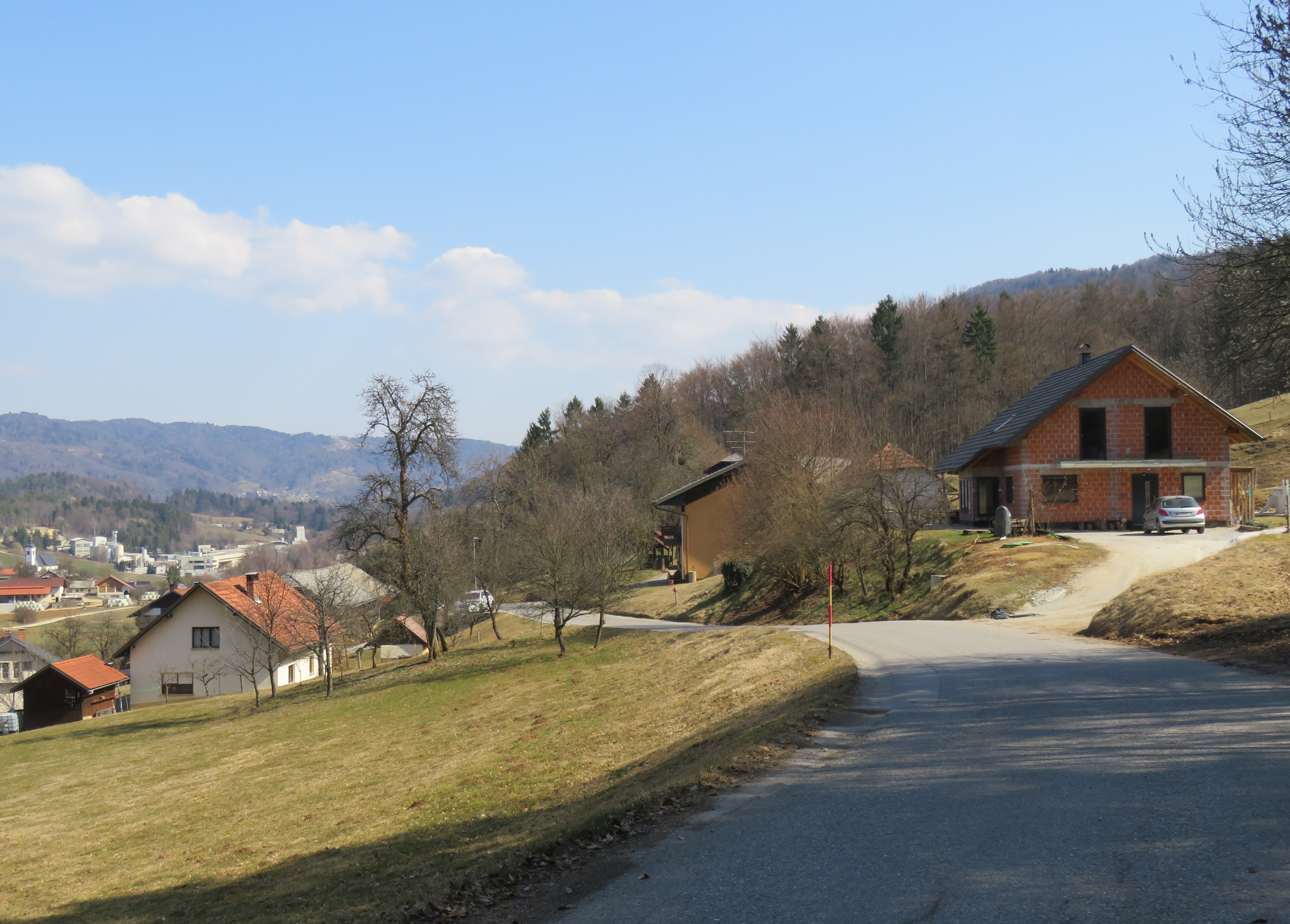

- Location in Slovenia
- Coordinates: 46°7′21″N 14°45′15″E
- Country: Slovenia
- Traditional region: Upper Carniola
- Statistical region: Central Slovenia
- Municipality: Moravče
- Elevation: 420 m (1,380 ft)

Kuga (Slovene pronunciation: [ˈkuːɡa]) is a former settlement in the Municipality of Moravče in central Slovenia. It is now part of the village of Drtija. The area is part of the traditional region of Upper Carniola. The municipality is now included in the Central Slovenia Statistical Region.

== Geography ==
Kuga lies southwest of the village center of Drtija, below the northwest slope of the Slivna Plateau.

== History ==
Kuga was annexed by Drtija in 1952, ending its existence as an independent settlement.
