= Kuga fiber variety =

Concept in algebraic geometry

In algebraic geometry, a Kuga fiber variety, introduced by Kuga (1966), is a fiber space whose fibers are abelian varieties and whose base space is an arithmetic quotient of a Hermitian symmetric space.
