= Michio Kuga =

Japanese mathematician

- Born: 1928
- Died: February 13, 1990 (aged 61–62)
- Education: University of Tokyo
- Scientific career
- Fields: Mathematics
- Workplaces: State University of New York at Stony Brook
- Doctoral advisor: Shokichi Iyanaga
- Doctoral students: Stephen S. Kudla

Michio Kuga (久賀 道郎, Kuga Michio; 1928 – 13 February 1990) was a mathematician who received his Ph.D. from University of Tokyo in 1960. His work helped lead to a proof of the Ramanujan conjecture which partly follows from the proof of the Weil conjectures by Deligne (1974).

In 1963–1964, he introduced Kuga fiber varieties in a book published by the University of Chicago Press. In the summer of 1965 he gave a talk on Kuga fiber varieties at the American Mathematical Society's Symposium in Pure Mathematics held at the University of Colorado Boulder. In 2019 Beijing's Higher Education Press published a reprint of Kuga's 1964 book.

One of his books, Galois' Dream: Group Theory and Differential Equations, is a series of lectures on group theory and differential equations for undergraduate students, considering such topics as covering spaces and Fuchsian differential equations from the point of view of Galois theory, though it does not treat classical Galois theory of polynomials and fields in depth.
