= Drtija =

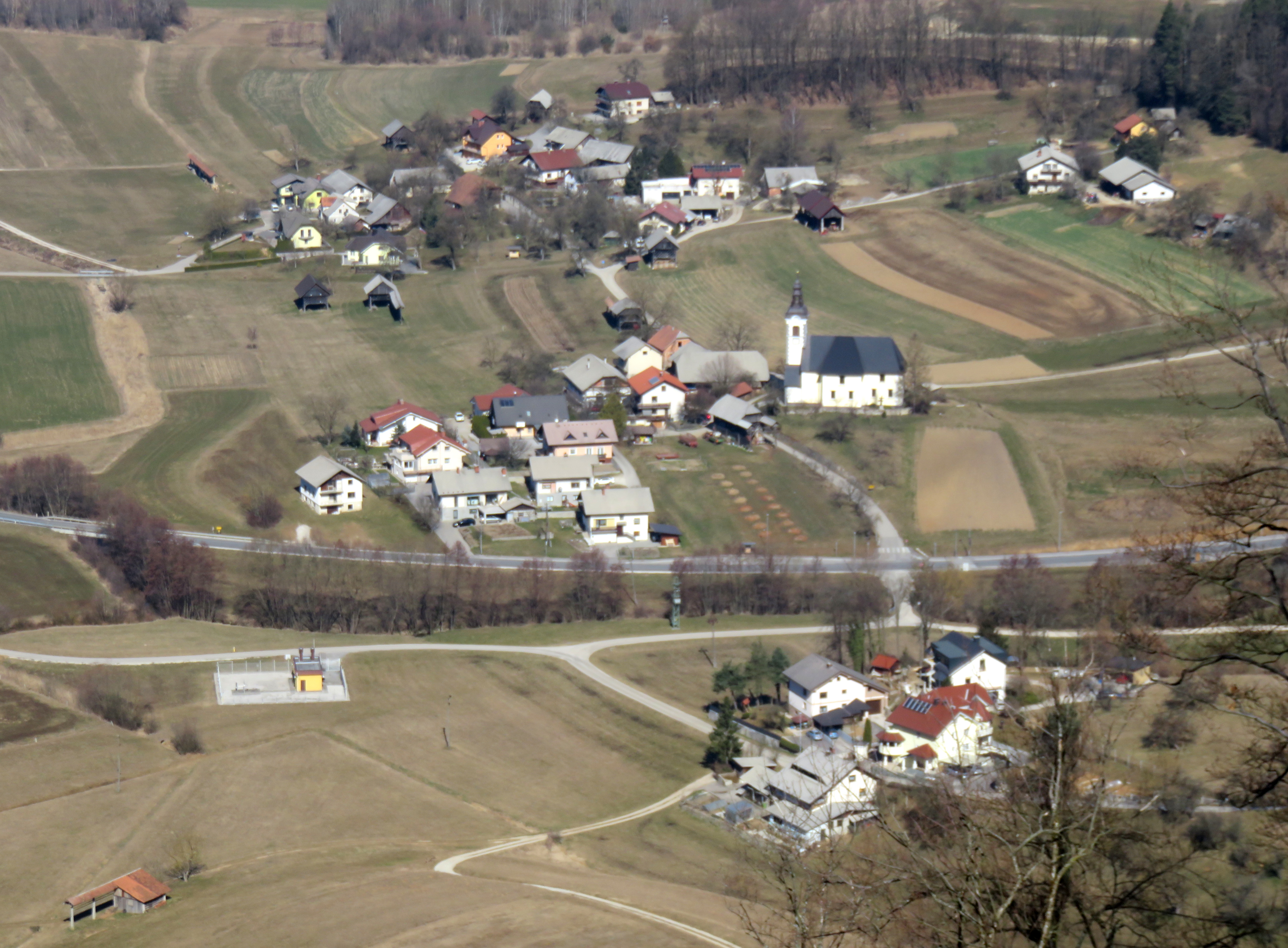

- Location in Slovenia
- Coordinates: 46°7′38.71″N 14°45′26.98″E
- Country: Slovenia
- Traditional region: Upper Carniola
- Statistical region: Central Slovenia
- Municipality: Moravče

Area
  - Total: 3.2 km^{2} (1.2 sq mi)
- Elevation: 377 m (1,237 ft)

Population (2002)
  - Total: 191
- Postal code: 1251

Drtija (pronounced [dəɾˈtiːja]; German: Drittai) is a settlement in the Municipality of Moravče in central Slovenia. The area is part of the traditional region of Upper Carniola. It is now included with the rest of the municipality in the Central Slovenia Statistical Region. The settlement includes the hamlets of Belnek, Brinje, Gorica, Kovačija, Podbrdo, Kuga, Štance Laze, Štebalija, Štorovje, and Straža. Before the First World War, the hamlets scattered along the Slivna Plateau were collectively known as Za Goro (German: Mariae Virginis).

== Name ==
Drtija was mentioned in written sources as Dritey in 1320, Dretey in 1322, Dritey in 1335, Drittey in 1405, and Dreytey in 1436, among other spellings. The original name has been reconstructed as *Drětija, which may be derived from the verb *drěti 'to tear, clear (land)'. If so, the name means 'cleared land'. Related toponyms include Drtno and Razdrto, as well as various microtoponyms (Drt, Drti, Drtica, Drtiči, Drtičje, Drtine, Drtniki).

== Belnek Castle ==
Belnek Castle (German: Wildeneck, Wildenegg) stood on a low rise in the former village of Belnek, which was annexed by Drtija in 1952.

== Church ==
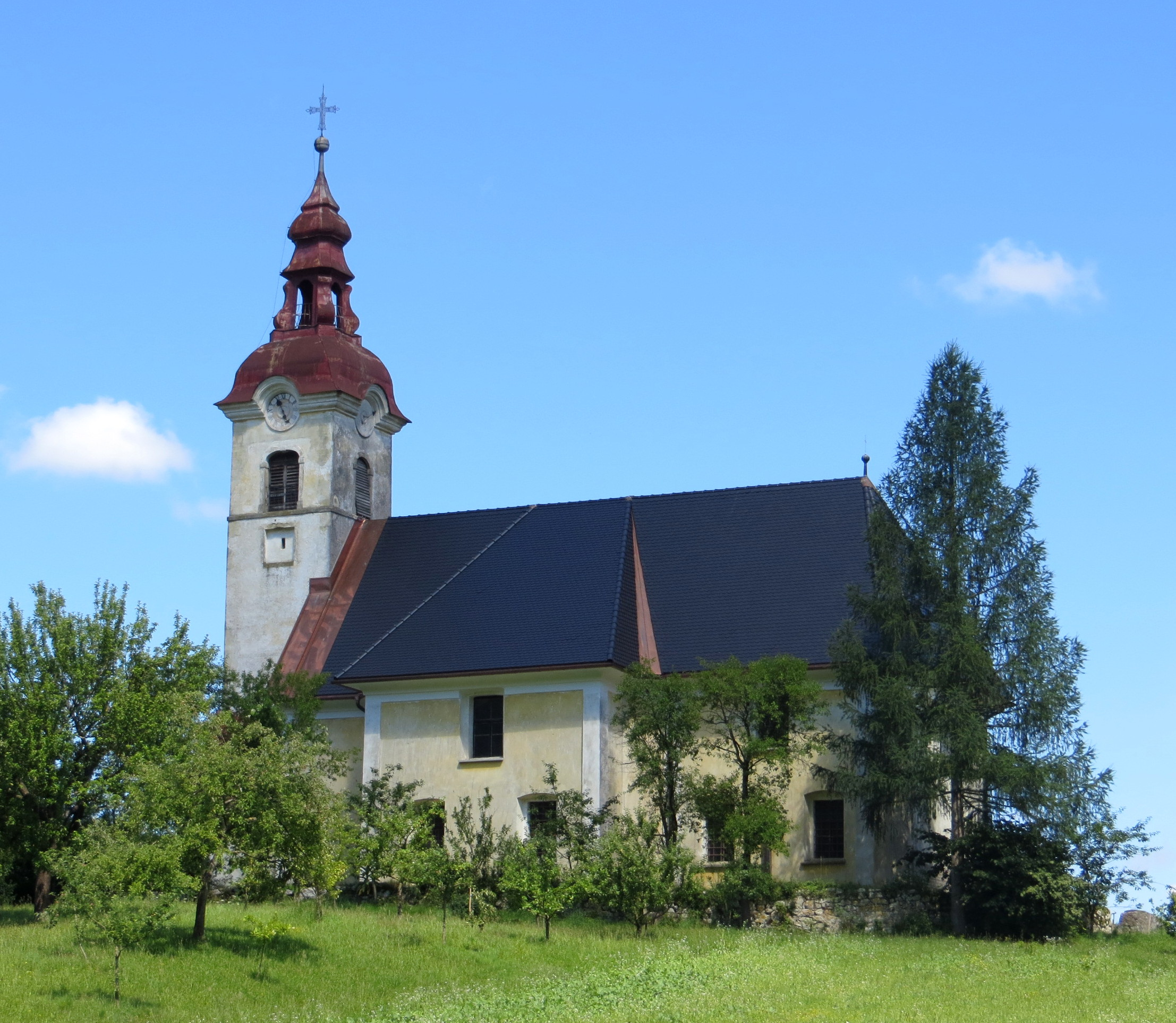
Mary Queen of Angels Church

The local church is dedicated to Mary Queen of Angels. It dates to the mid-18th century and belongs to the Parish of Moravče.
