= Hribi, Lukovica =

Hribi
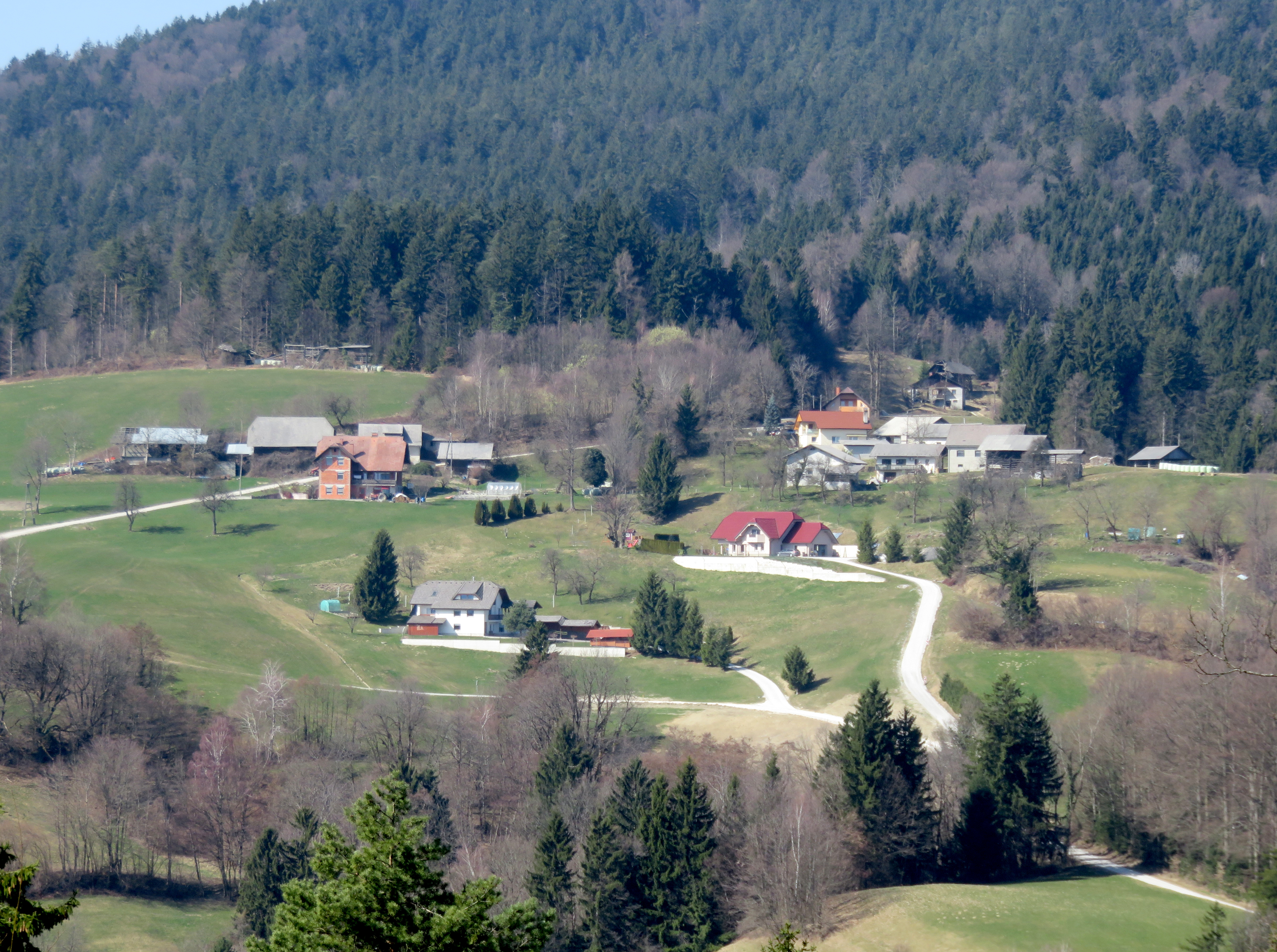

- Location in Slovenia
- Coordinates: 46°11′40.43″N 14°53′30.07″E
- Country: Slovenia
- Traditional region: Upper Carniola
- Statistical region: Central Slovenia
- Municipality: Lukovica

Area
  - Total: 4.65 km^{2} (1.80 sq mi)
- Elevation: 650 m (2,130 ft)

Population (2002)
  - Total: 50

Hribi (pronounced [ˈxɾiːbi]) is a dispersed settlement near Trojane in the Municipality of Lukovica in the eastern part of the Upper Carniola region of Slovenia. It includes the hamlets of Hribi and Zapleš (in older sources also Za Plešjo, German: Saplesch) to the south, Lebenice to the north, and Velika Raven (German: Welkaraun) and Drtno to the west.

== Name ==
The name Hribi literally means 'hills', referring to the settlement's terrain. Hribi was attested in written sources as Berg in 1430 and Vhribich in 1571.
