= Zalog pri Moravčah =

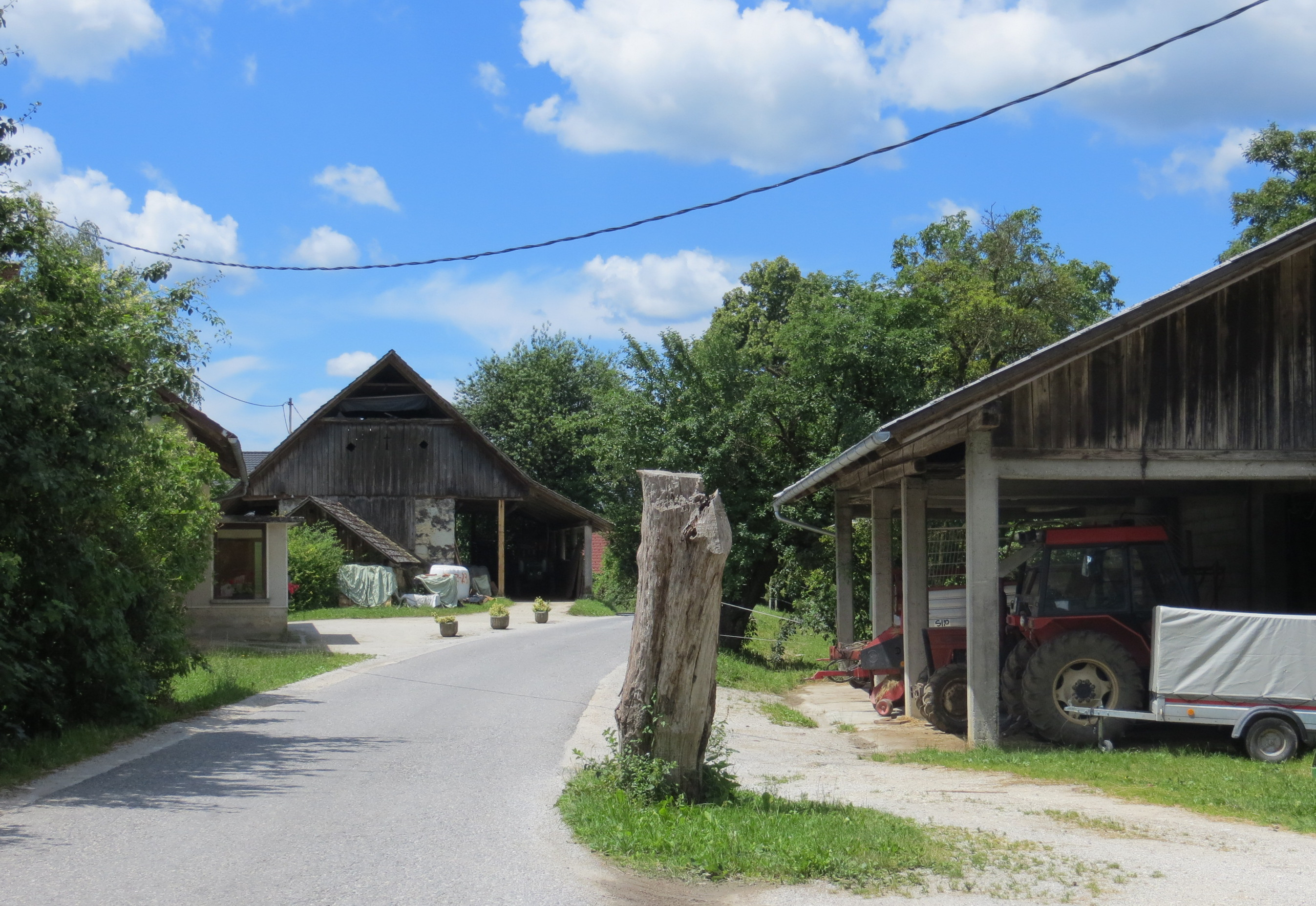

- Location in Slovenia
- Coordinates: 46°8′15.28″N 14°45′10.51″E
- Country: Slovenia
- Traditional region: Upper Carniola
- Statistical region: Central Slovenia
- Municipality: Moravče

Area
  - Total: 1.17 km^{2} (0.45 sq mi)
- Elevation: 384.2 m (1,260 ft)

Population (2019)
  - Total: 188
  - Density: 160/km^{2} (410/sq mi)
- Time zone: UTC+1 (UTC)
  - Summer (DST): UTC+2 (UTC)
- Postal code: 1251

Zalog pri Moravčah (pronounced [ˈzaːlɔk pɾi mɔˈɾaːu̯tʃax]) is a settlement immediately east of Moravče in central Slovenia. The area is part of the traditional region of Upper Carniola. It is now included with the rest of the municipality in the Central Slovenia Statistical Region. It includes the hamlets of Planina, Učak, and Vahtenberk (German: Wartenberg).
