= Češnjice pri Moravčah =

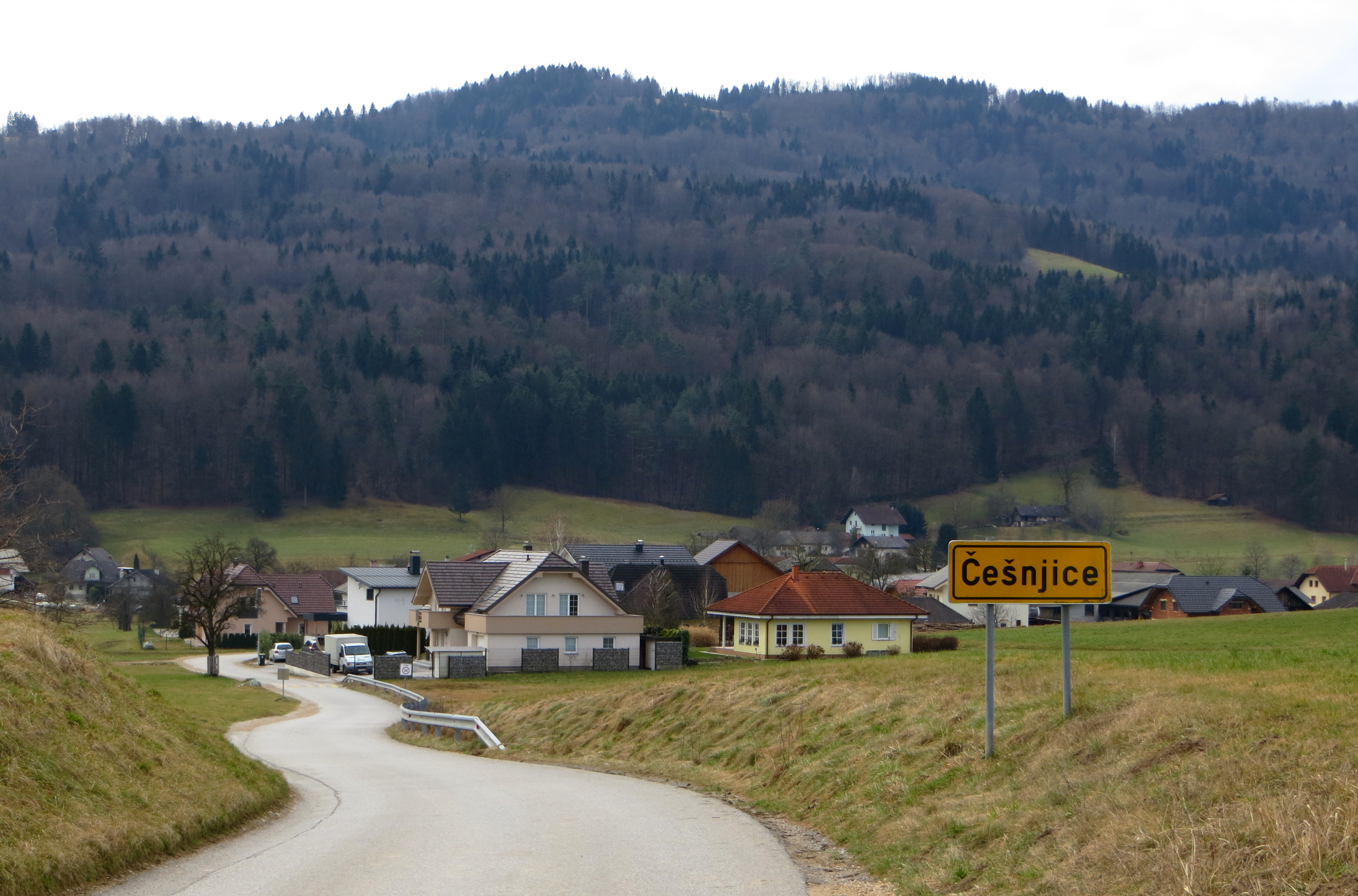

- Location in Slovenia
- Coordinates: 46°7′36.66″N 14°44′39″E
- Country: Slovenia
- Traditional region: Upper Carniola
- Statistical region: Central Slovenia
- Municipality: Moravče

Area
  - Total: 3.04 km^{2} (1.17 sq mi)
- Elevation: 368.4 m (1,209 ft)

Population (2002)
  - Total: 193
- Postal code: 1251

Češnjice pri Moravčah (pronounced [ˈtʃeːʃnjitsɛ pɾi mɔˈɾaːu̯tʃax]; German: Kerschdorf) is a settlement in the Municipality of Moravče in central Slovenia. The area is part of the traditional region of Upper Carniola. It is now included with the rest of the municipality in the Central Slovenia Statistical Region.

== Name ==
Češnjice pri Moravčah was attested in historical sources as Chersteten in 1367, Nider Kerstet in 1431, Ober Cherstetten in 1436, and Kerssteten in 1444, among other names. The name of the settlement was changed from Češnjice to Češnjice pri Moravčah in 1953. In the past the German name was Kerschdorf.

== Cultural heritage ==
A 16th-century mansion, built on a small hill in the southeastern part of the settlement, was burned by the Partisans in 1943.
