= Limbarska Gora =

Limbarska Gora Sveti Valentin (until 1955)
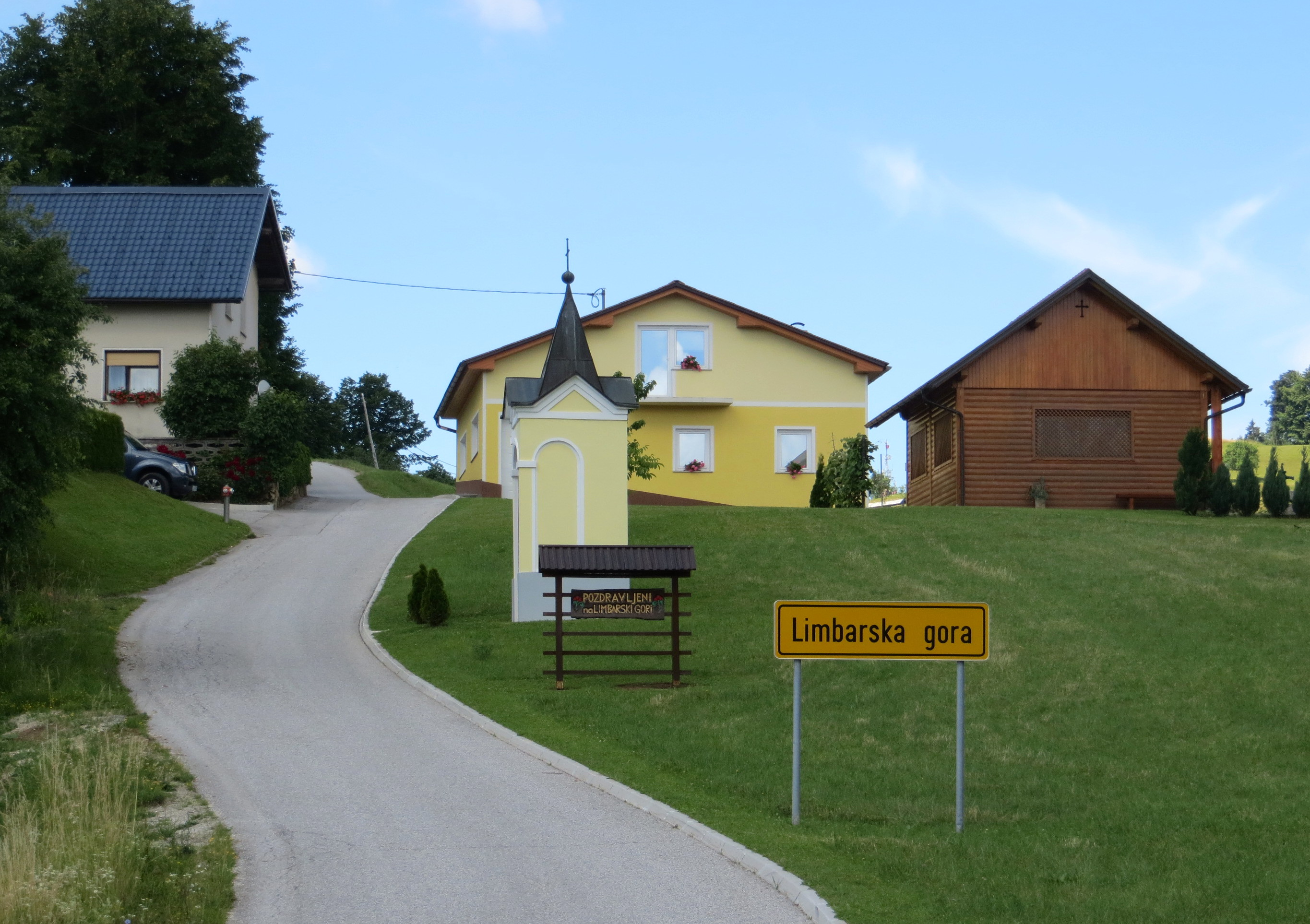

- Location in Slovenia
- Coordinates: 46°9′34.5″N 14°46′41.05″E
- Country: Slovenia
- Traditional region: Upper Carniola
- Statistical region: Central Slovenia
- Municipality: Moravče

Area
  - Total: 3.44 km^{2} (1.33 sq mi)
- Elevation: 715.5 m (2,347 ft)

Population (2002)
  - Total: 93
- Postal code: 1251

Limbarska Gora (pronounced [ˈliːmbaɾska ˈɡɔːɾa]) is a settlement in the Municipality of Moravče in central Slovenia. The area is part of the traditional region of Upper Carniola. It is now included with the rest of the municipality in the Central Slovenia Statistical Region.

== Name ==
The name of the settlement was changed from Sveti Valentin (literally, 'Saint Valentine') to Limbarska Gora in 1955. The name was changed on the basis of the 1948 Law on Names of Settlements and Designations of Squares, Streets, and Buildings as part of efforts by Slovenia's postwar communist government to remove religious elements from toponyms. Prior to this, the name Limbarska gora referred to the hill where the village stands. The place was attested in written sources in 1156 as Lilienberch (and as Liliemberch in 1202 and Liebnberch in 1338). The Slovene name is a corruption of the Middle High German name Limberg, which developed from Lilienberg (< lilie 'lily' + berc 'mountain') through haplology, or possibly from German *Lielenberg (literally, 'clematis mountain').

== Church ==
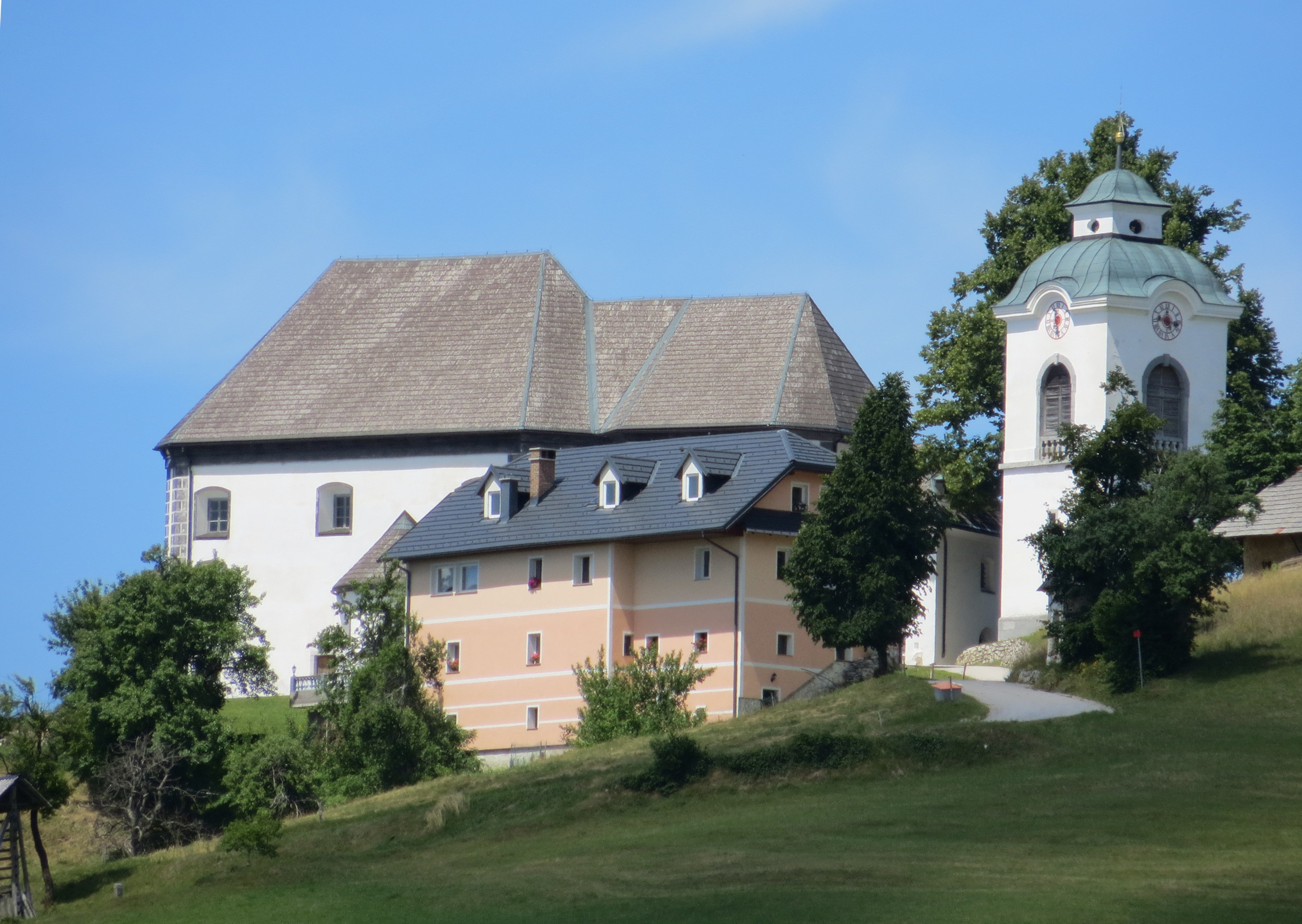
St. Valentine's Church

The local church, built on the top of the hill known as Lily Mountain (Limbarska gora; 773 m or 2,536 ft), is dedicated to Saint Valentine and belongs to the Parish of Moravče. It was built by Gregor Maček, Jr. around 1730 and has a free-standing short belfry.
