= Gradišče, Škofljica =

Gradišče Gradišče nad Pijavo Gorico (1953–2008)
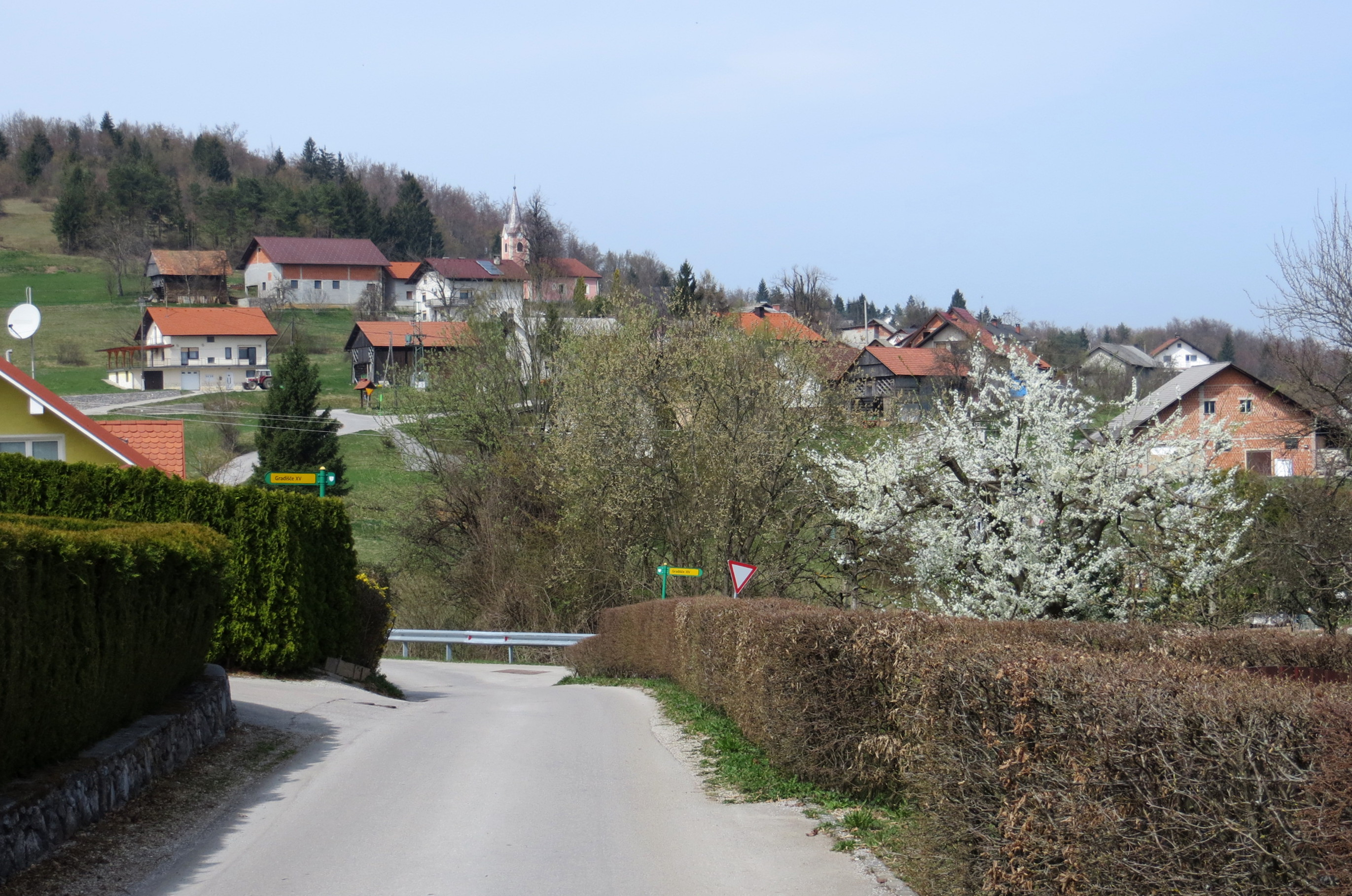

- Location in Slovenia
- Coordinates: 45°55′34.61″N 14°35′8.59″E
- Country: Slovenia
- Traditional region: Lower Carniola
- Statistical region: Central Slovenia
- Municipality: Škofljica

Area
  - Total: 1.5 km^{2} (0.58 sq mi)
- Elevation: 533.8 m (1,751 ft)

Population (2012)
  - Total: 773
  - Density: 516/km^{2} (1,340/sq mi)
- Time zone: UTC+01 (CET)
  - Summer (DST): UTC+02 (CEST)
- Postal code: 1291

Gradišče (pronounced [ɡɾaˈdiːʃtʃɛ]) is a settlement in the hills south of Pijava Gorica in the Municipality of Škofljica in central Slovenia. The municipality is part of the traditional region of Lower Carniola and is now included in the Central Slovenia Statistical Region.

== Name ==
The name of the settlement was changed from Gradišče to Gradišče nad Pijavo Gorico in 1953 and then again back to Gradišče in January 2008. At the same time a street system was introduced, with most streets now bearing Roman numerals. Before this all properties had numbers for the village with no individual street names.

== History ==
As its name suggests (in Slovene: Gradišče means 'fortified hillfort'), archaeological excavations have revealed the site of a large prehistoric Late Bronze Age and Early Iron Age settlement with associated earthworks and a burial ground.

== Church ==
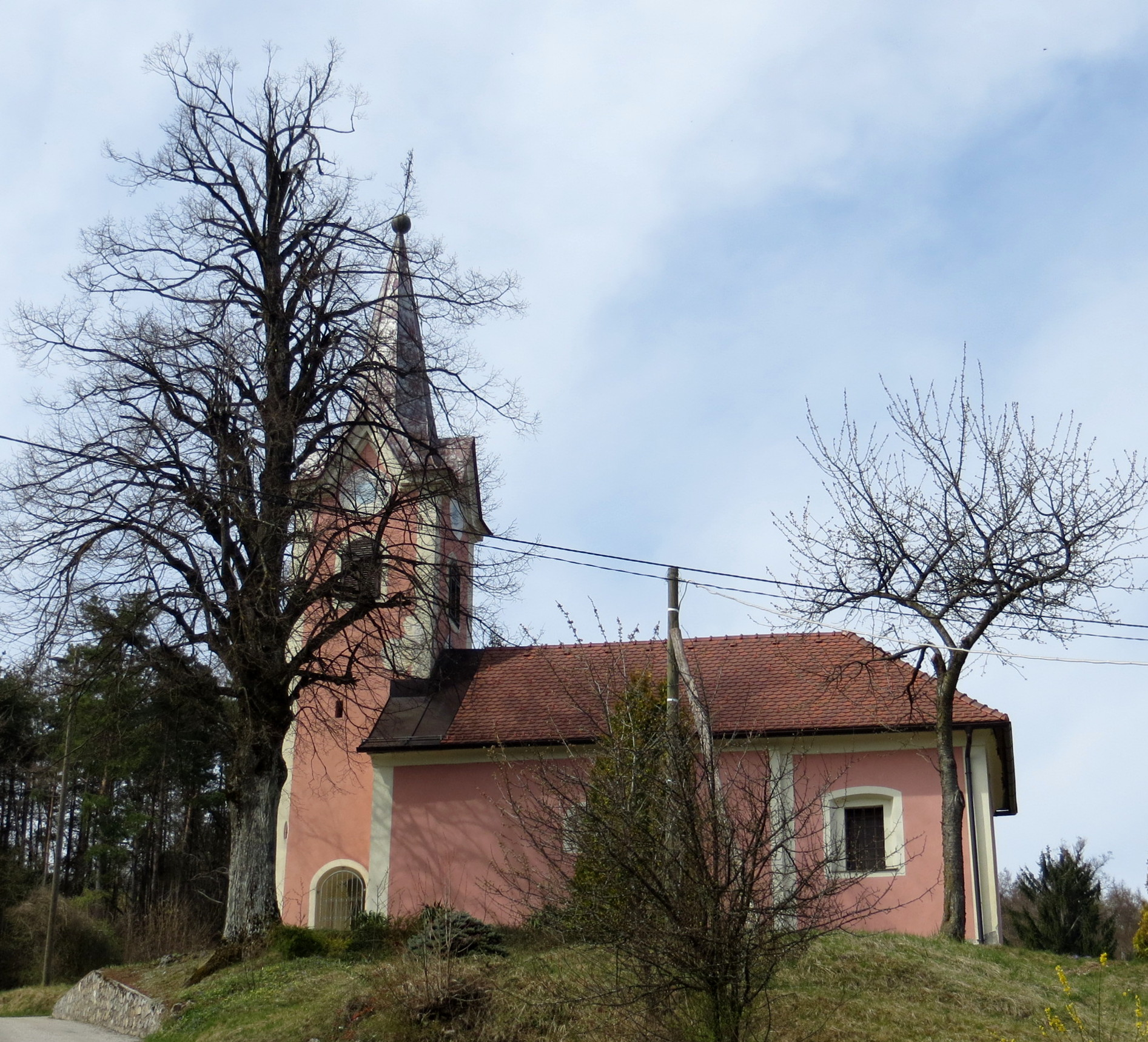
Saints Primus and Felician Church

The local church is dedicated to Saints Primus and Felician and belongs to the Parish of Želimlje. It was originally a 12th-century Romanesque building that was restyled in the Baroque style in the 17th century.
