= Glinek, Škofljica =

Glinek
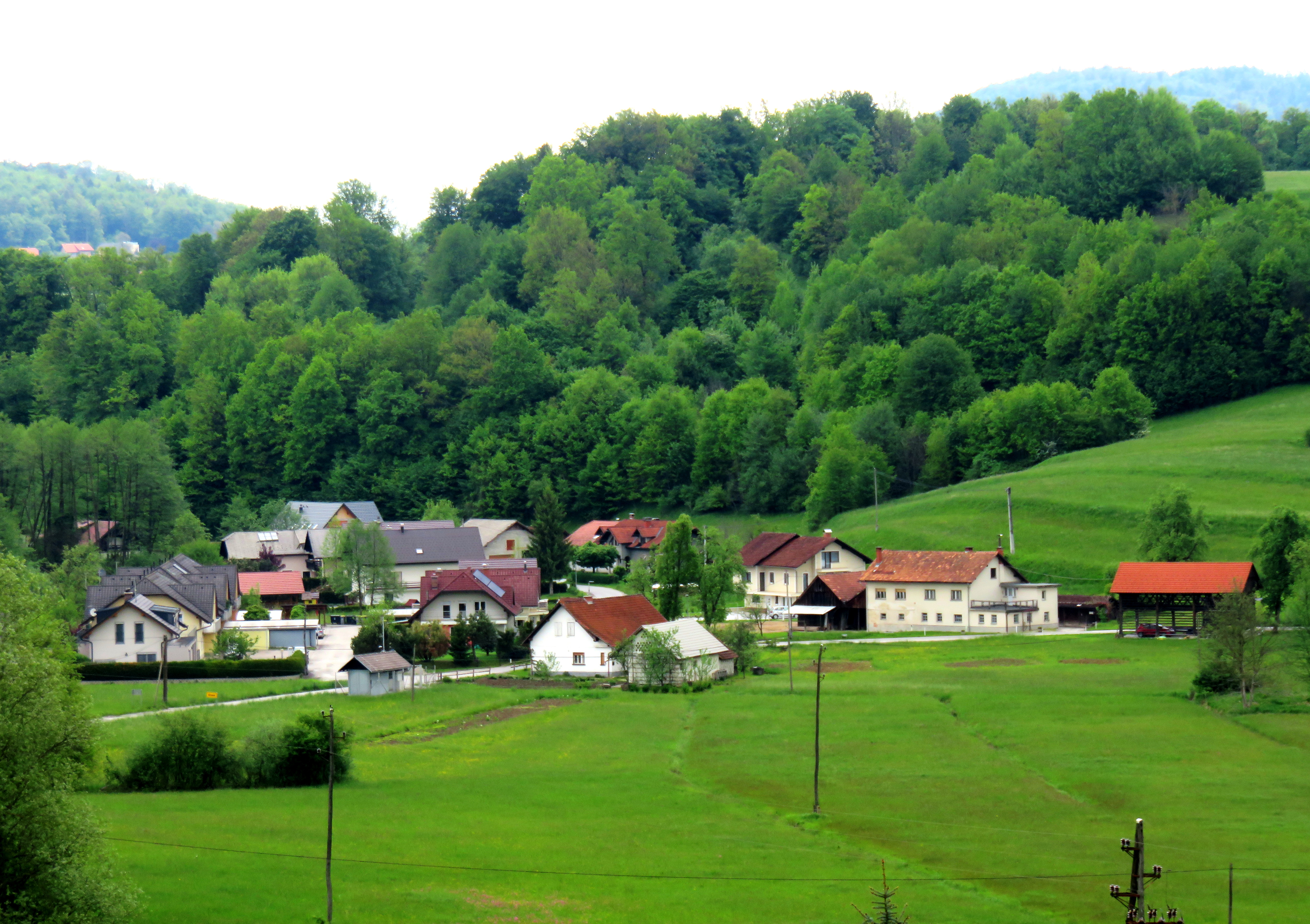

- Location in Slovenia
- Coordinates: 45°58′16.84″N 14°34′54.84″E
- Country: Slovenia
- Traditional region: Lower Carniola
- Statistical region: Central Slovenia
- Municipality: Škofljica

Area
  - Total: 0.79 km^{2} (0.31 sq mi)
- Elevation: 305.5 m (1,002 ft)

Population (2002)
  - Total: 92
- Postal code: 1291

Glinek (pronounced [ˈɡliːnək]) is a small settlement south of Škofljica in central Slovenia. The entire Municipality of Škofljica is part of the traditional region of Lower Carniola. It is included in the Central Slovenia Statistical Region.

== Name ==
Glinek was attested in historical sources as Glunk c. 1330 and Glynikg in 1439, among other spellings.
