= Pleše, Škofljica =

Pleše
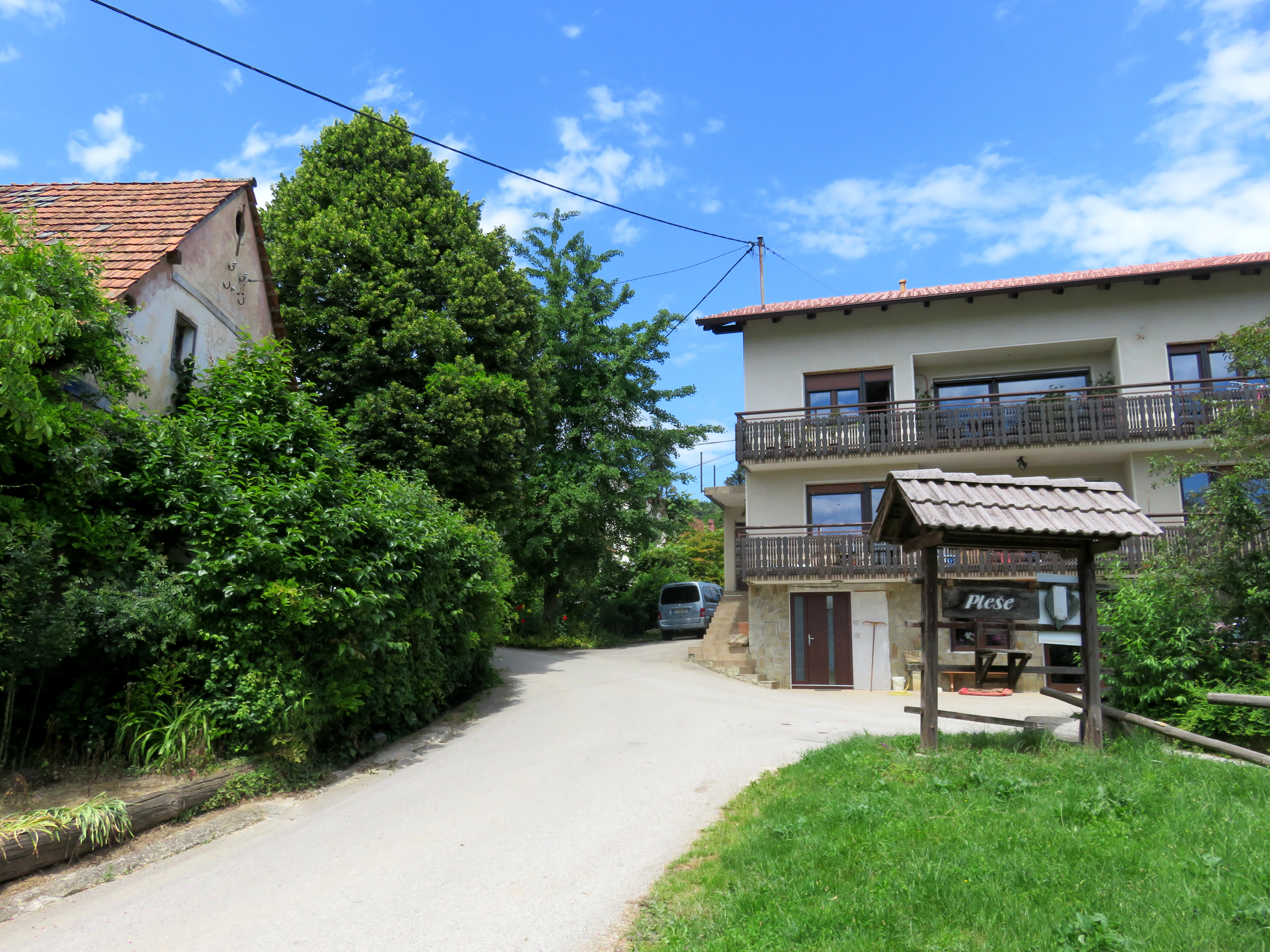

- Location in Slovenia
- Coordinates: 45°59′41.73″N 14°36′33.2″E
- Country: Slovenia
- Traditional region: Lower Carniola
- Statistical region: Central Slovenia
- Municipality: Škofljica

Area
  - Total: 1.52 km^{2} (0.59 sq mi)
- Elevation: 440.2 m (1,444 ft)

Population (2002)
  - Total: 45
- Postal code: 1291

Pleše (pronounced [ˈpleːʃɛ]) is a settlement in the hills east of Škofljica in central Slovenia. The Municipality of Škofljica is part of the traditional region of Lower Carniola and is now included in the Central Slovenia Statistical Region.

== Name ==
Pleše was attested in historical sources as Ples in 1463, Plebss in 1468, and Pless in 1482.
