= Klada, Škofljica =

Klada
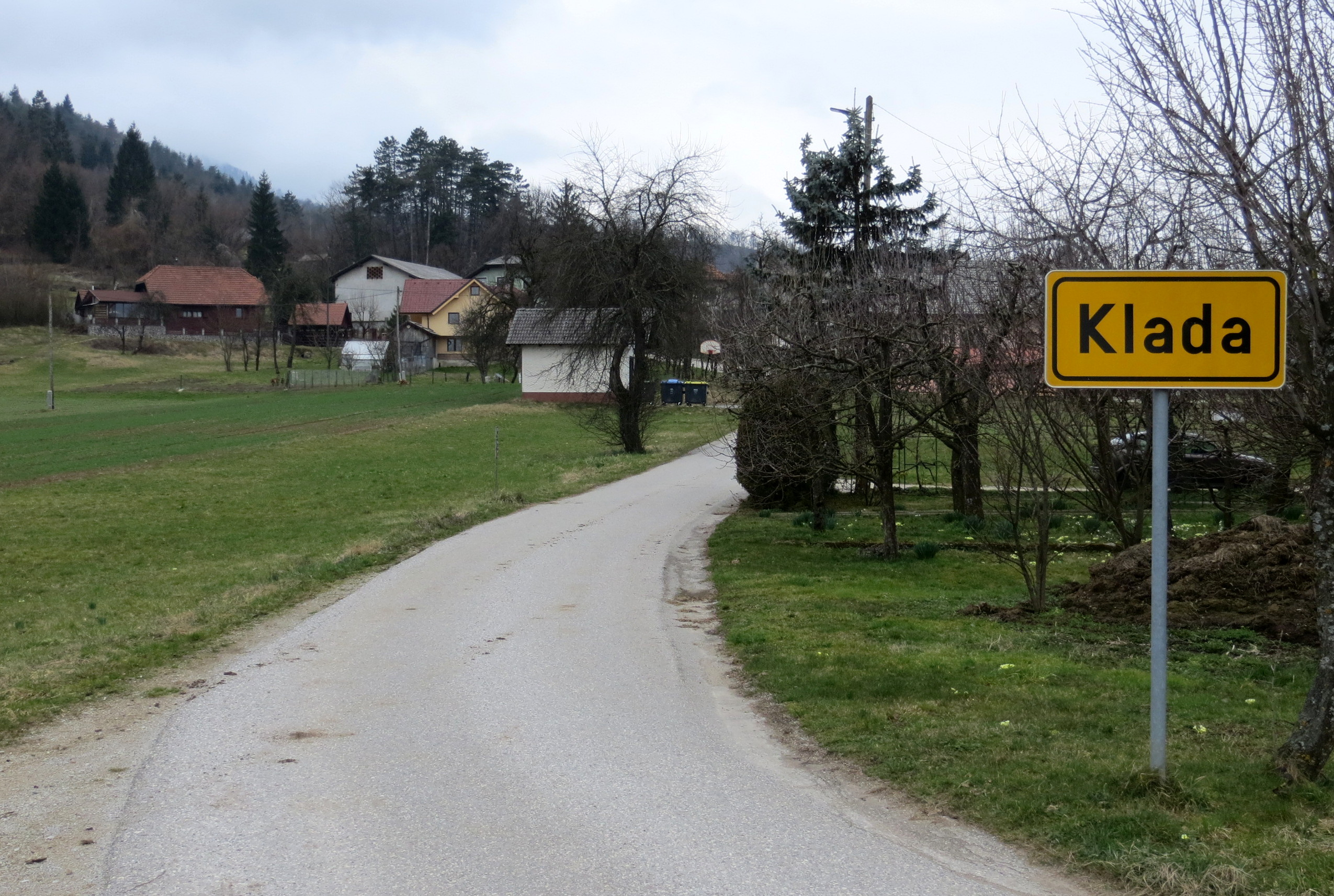

- Location in Slovenia
- Coordinates: 45°55′14.81″N 14°33′30.8″E
- Country: Slovenia
- Traditional region: Lower Carniola
- Statistical region: Central Slovenia
- Municipality: Škofljica

Area
  - Total: 0.93 km^{2} (0.36 sq mi)
- Elevation: 484.4 m (1,589 ft)

Population (2002)
  - Total: 44
- Postal code: 1291

Klada (pronounced [ˈklaːda]) is a small village above Želimlje in the Municipality of Škofljica in central Slovenia. The municipality is part of the traditional region of Lower Carniola and is now included in the Central Slovenia Statistical Region.

Hallstatt culture-era tumuli identified near the settlement are believed to be part of the burial ground of a prehistoric Iron Age settlement in nearby Golo.
