= Vrh nad Želimljami =

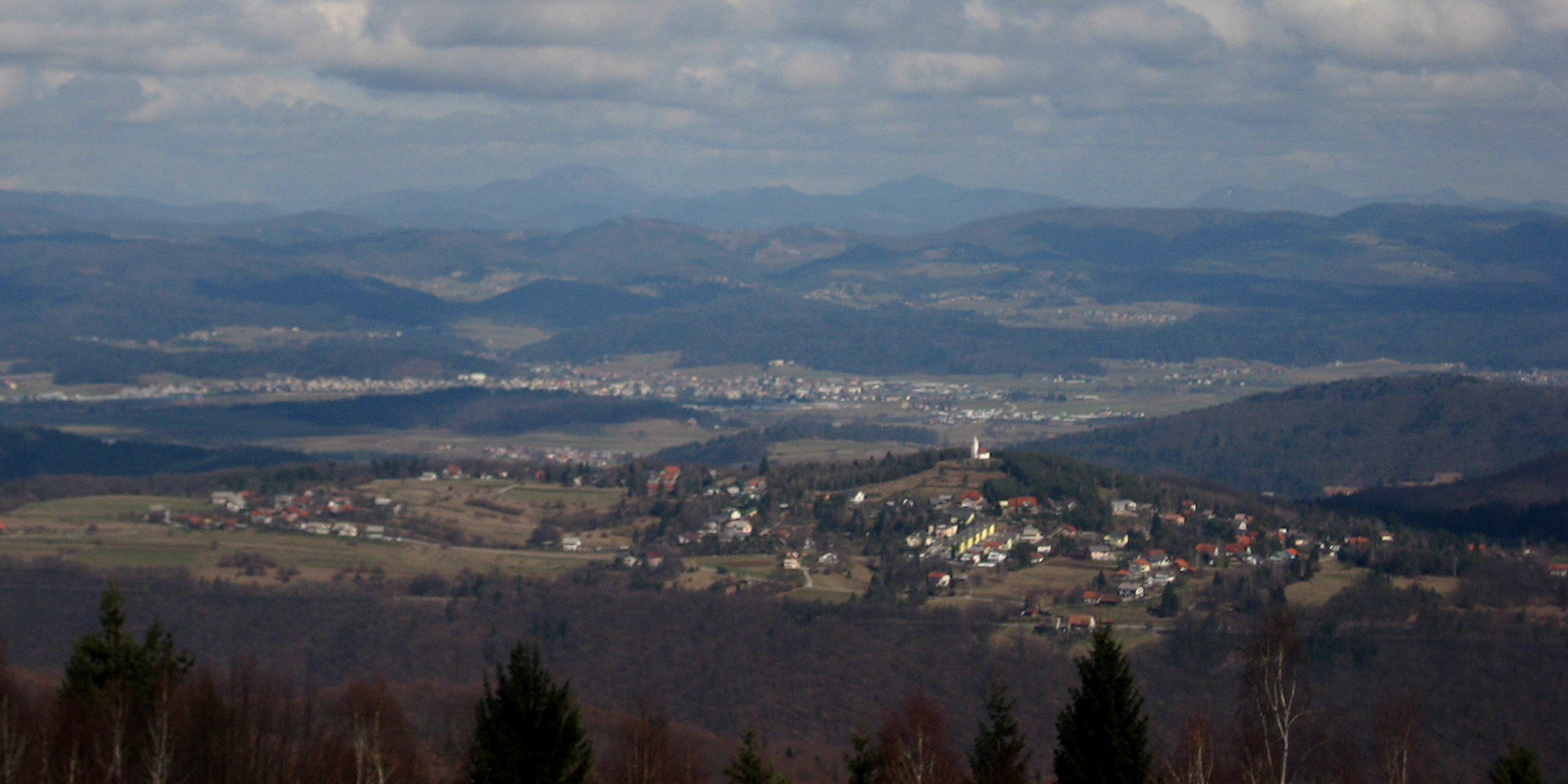

- Location in Slovenia
- Coordinates: 45°54′41.21″N 14°35′22.44″E
- Country: Slovenia
- Traditional region: Lower Carniola
- Statistical region: Central Slovenia
- Municipality: Škofljica

Area
  - Total: 1 km^{2} (0.39 sq mi)
- Elevation: 537.9 m (1,765 ft)

Population (2012)
  - Total: 293
  - Density: 290/km^{2} (760/sq mi)
- Postal code: 1291

Vrh nad Želimljami (pronounced [ˈʋəɾx nat ʒɛˈliːmljami]) is a settlement above Želimlje in the Municipality of Škofljica in central Slovenia. The municipality is part of the traditional region of Lower Carniola and is now included in the Central Slovenia Statistical Region.

== Name ==
The name of the settlement was changed from Vrh to Vrh nad Želimljami in 1953.

== Church ==
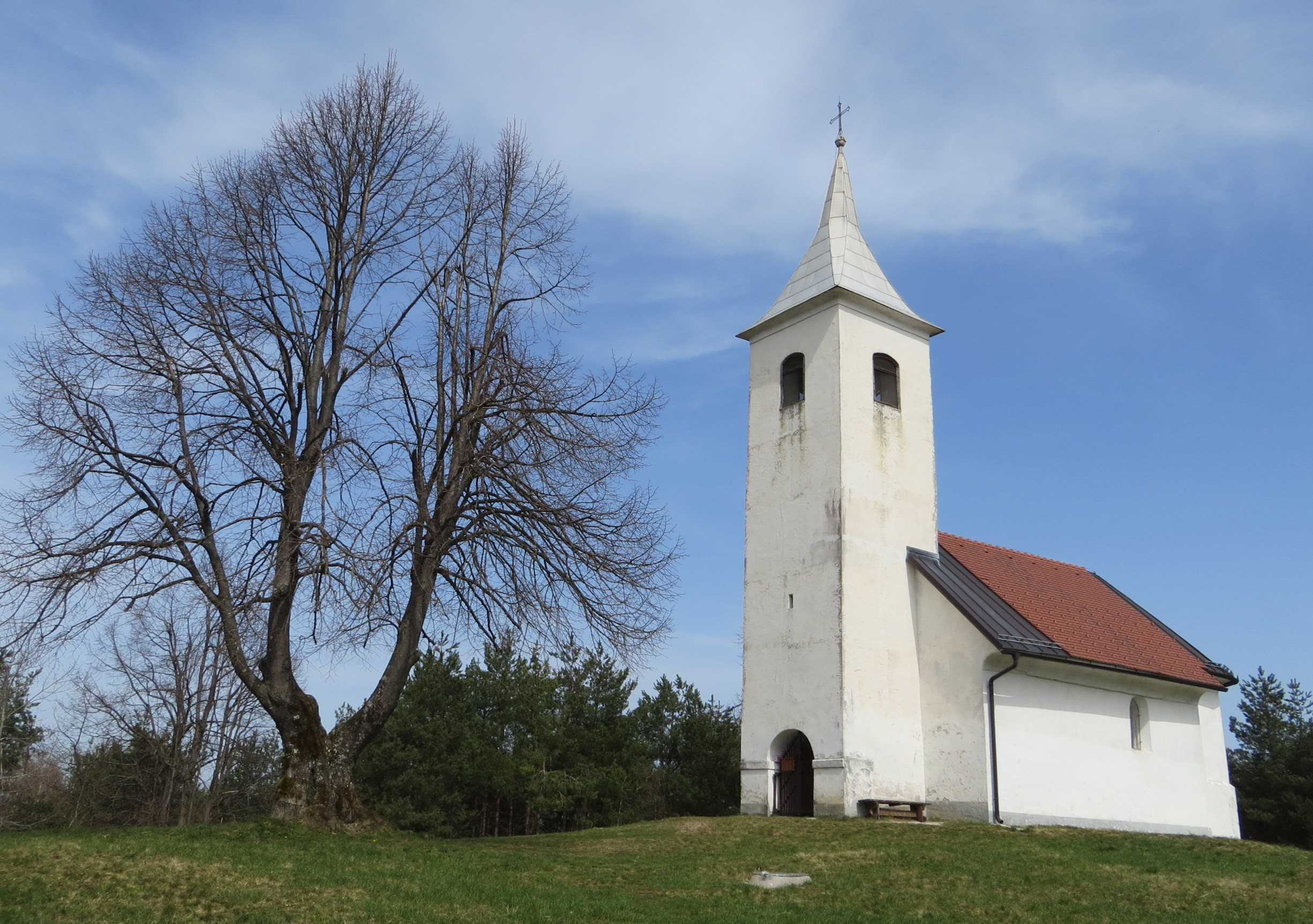
Saint Peter's Church

The local church is dedicated to Saint Peter and belongs to the Parish of Želimlje. It is a 15th-century Gothic building that was restyled in the Baroque. Fragments of mid-15th-century frescos are preserved on its interior walls.
