= Gorenje Blato =

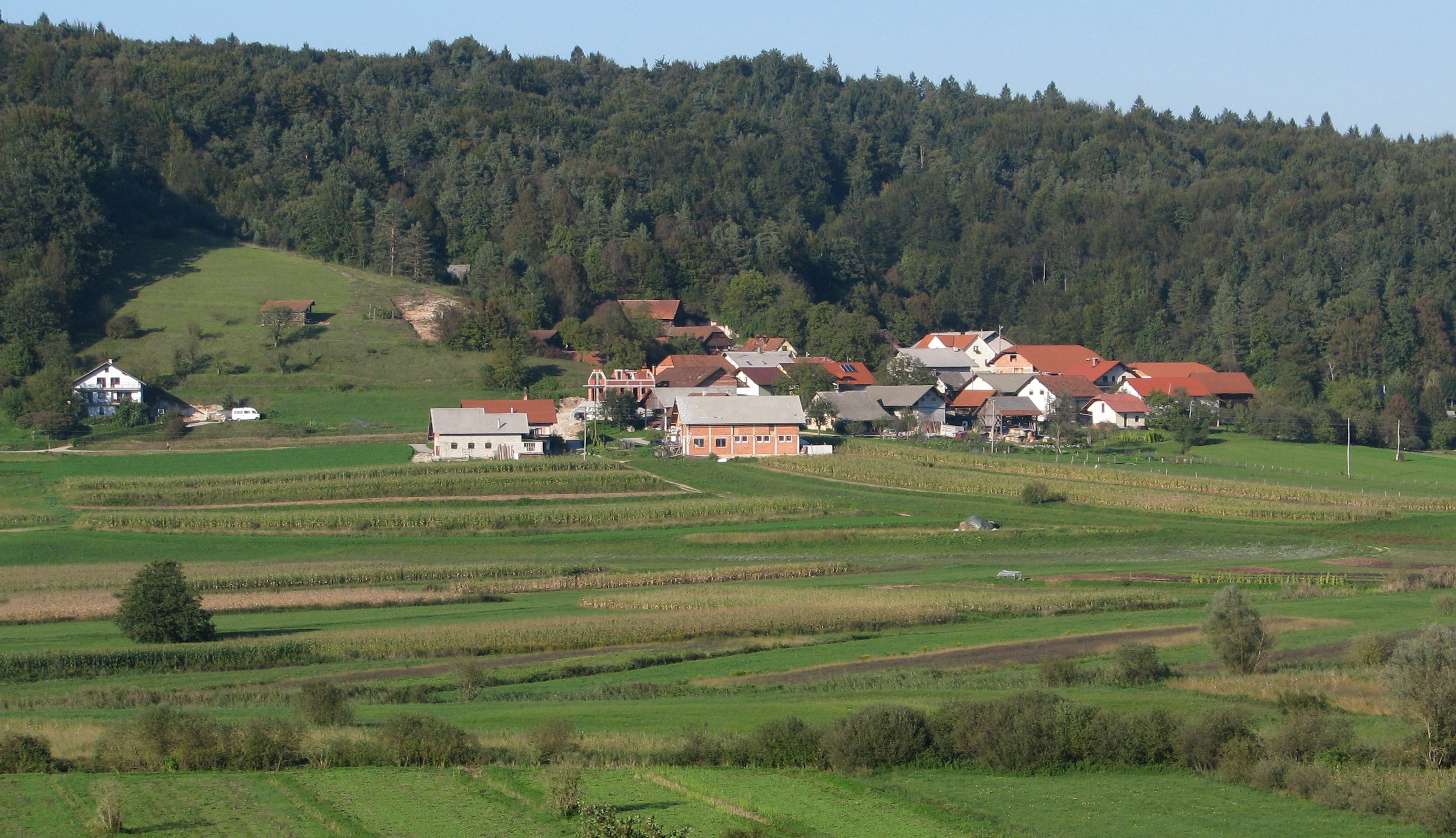

- Location in Slovenia
- Coordinates: 45°57′36.73″N 14°35′9.08″E
- Country: Slovenia
- Traditional region: Lower Carniola
- Statistical region: Central Slovenia
- Municipality: Škofljica

Area
  - Total: 1.52 km^{2} (0.59 sq mi)
- Elevation: 314.9 m (1,033 ft)

Population (2002)
  - Total: 163
- Postal code: 1291

Gorenje Blato (pronounced [ɡɔˈɾeːnjɛ ˈblaːtɔ]; German: Oberblato) is a settlement in the Municipality of Škofljica in central Slovenia. It lies on the edge of the marshlands south of the capital Ljubljana, east of Pijava Gorica. The municipality is part of the traditional region of Lower Carniola and is now included in the Central Slovenia Statistical Region.

== Name ==
Gorenje Blato was attested in historical sources as Mos in 1267 and Moss in 1424.

== Cultural heritage ==
There is a small chapel-shrine in the settlement, dating to the 17th century. It contains a wooden altar with a statue of Mary.
