= Gumnišče =

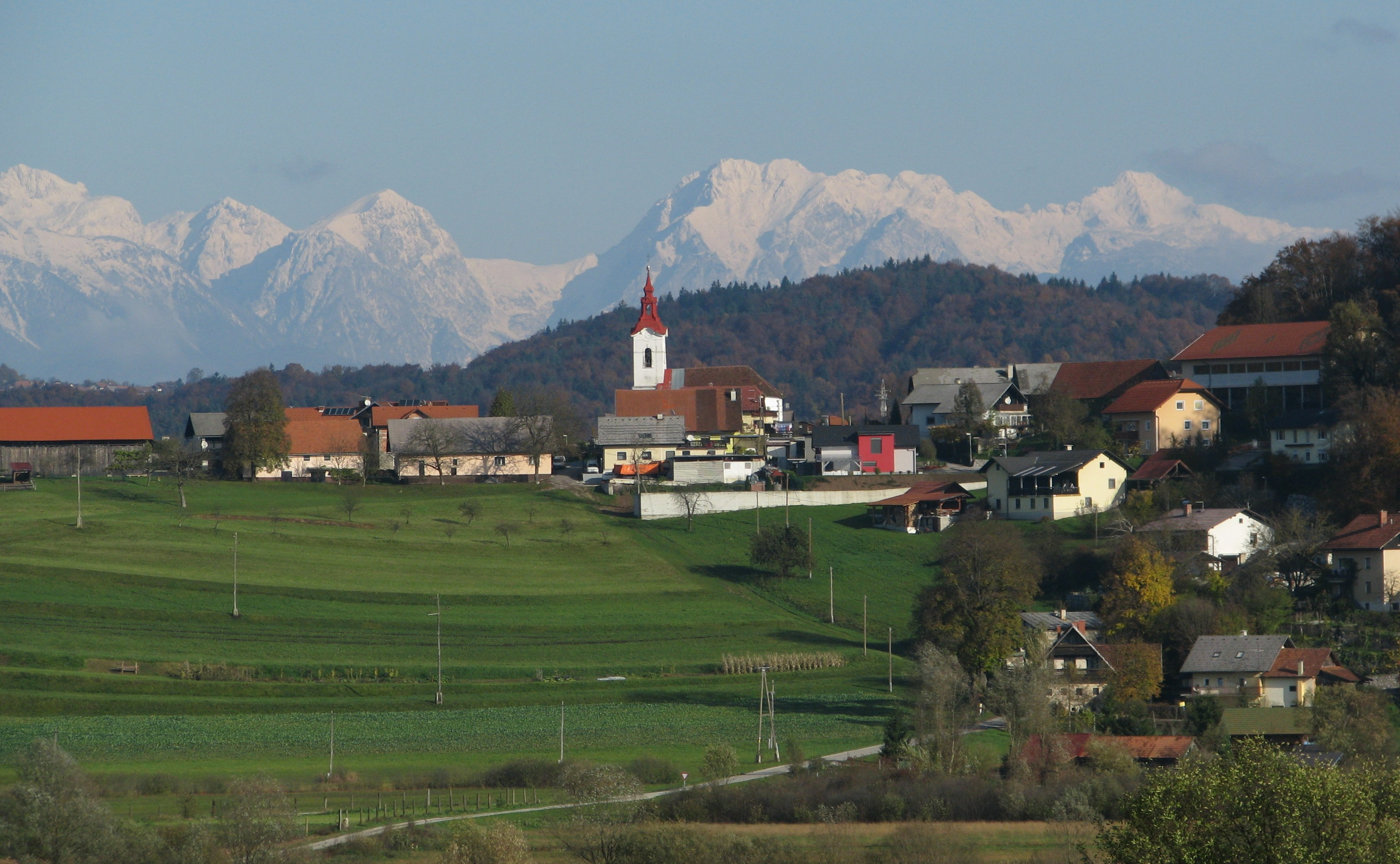

- Location in Slovenia
- Coordinates: 45°57′57.64″N 14°34′30.37″E
- Country: Slovenia
- Traditional region: Lower Carniola
- Statistical region: Central Slovenia
- Municipality: Škofljica

Area
  - Total: 1.79 km^{2} (0.69 sq mi)
- Elevation: 331.7 m (1,088 ft)

Population (2011)
  - Total: 161
- Postal code: 1291

Gumnišče (pronounced [ɡuˈmniːʃtʃɛ]) is a small village north of Pijava Gorica in the Municipality of Škofljica in central Slovenia. It lies on the edge of the marshlands south of Ljubljana. The municipality is part of the traditional region of Lower Carniola and is now included in the Central Slovenia Statistical Region.

The Potsdam Institute for Climate Impact Research has identified its environment as being in danger from urban sprawl as a result of its proximity to Ljubljana.

== Church ==
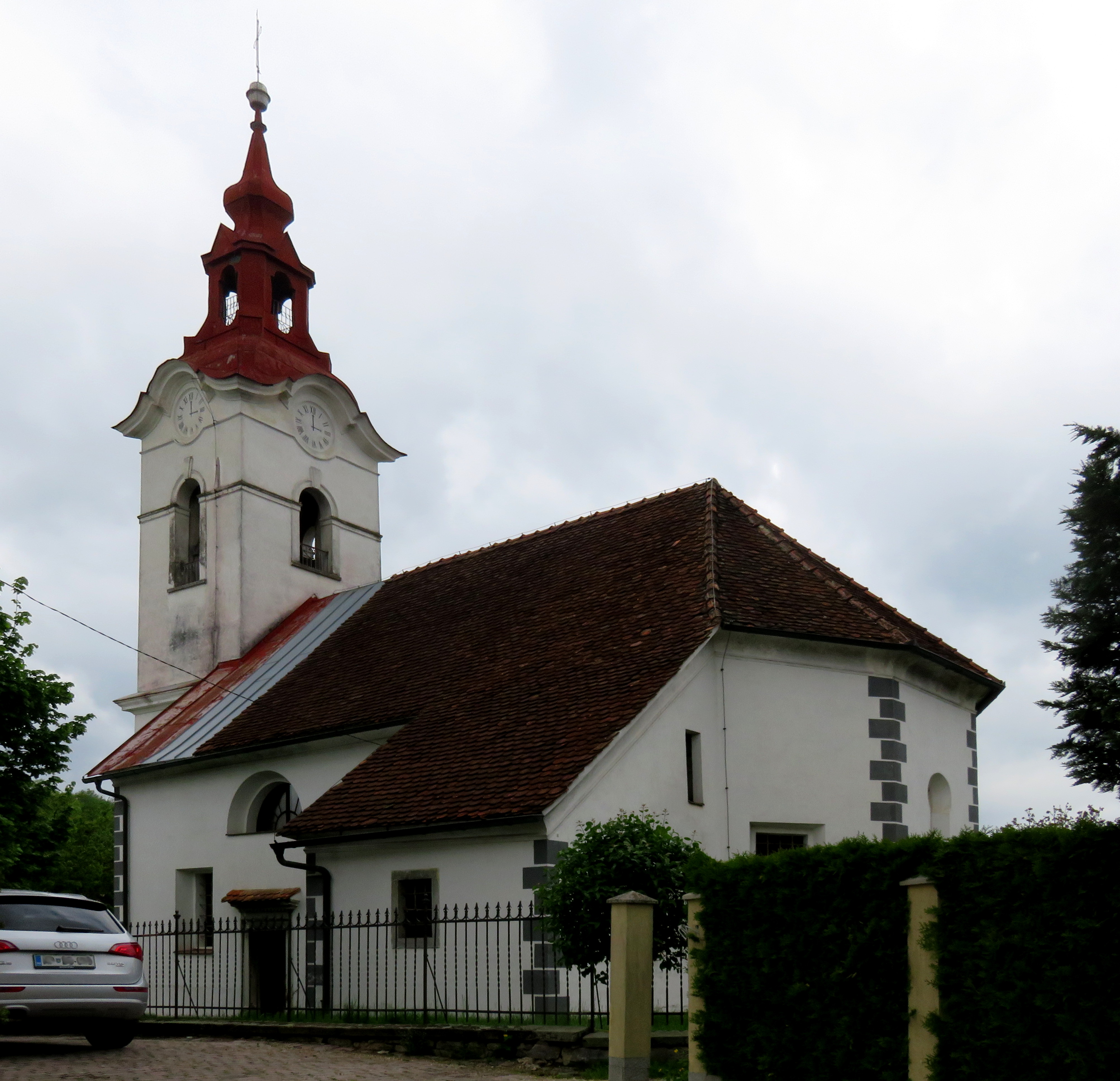
Holy Spirit Church

The local church, built in the centre of the settlement, is dedicated to the Holy Spirit and belongs to the Parish of Škofljica. It is a Late Gothic building, dating to the 16th century with some 17th- and 18th-century alterations.
