= Brezje, Škofljica =

Brezje
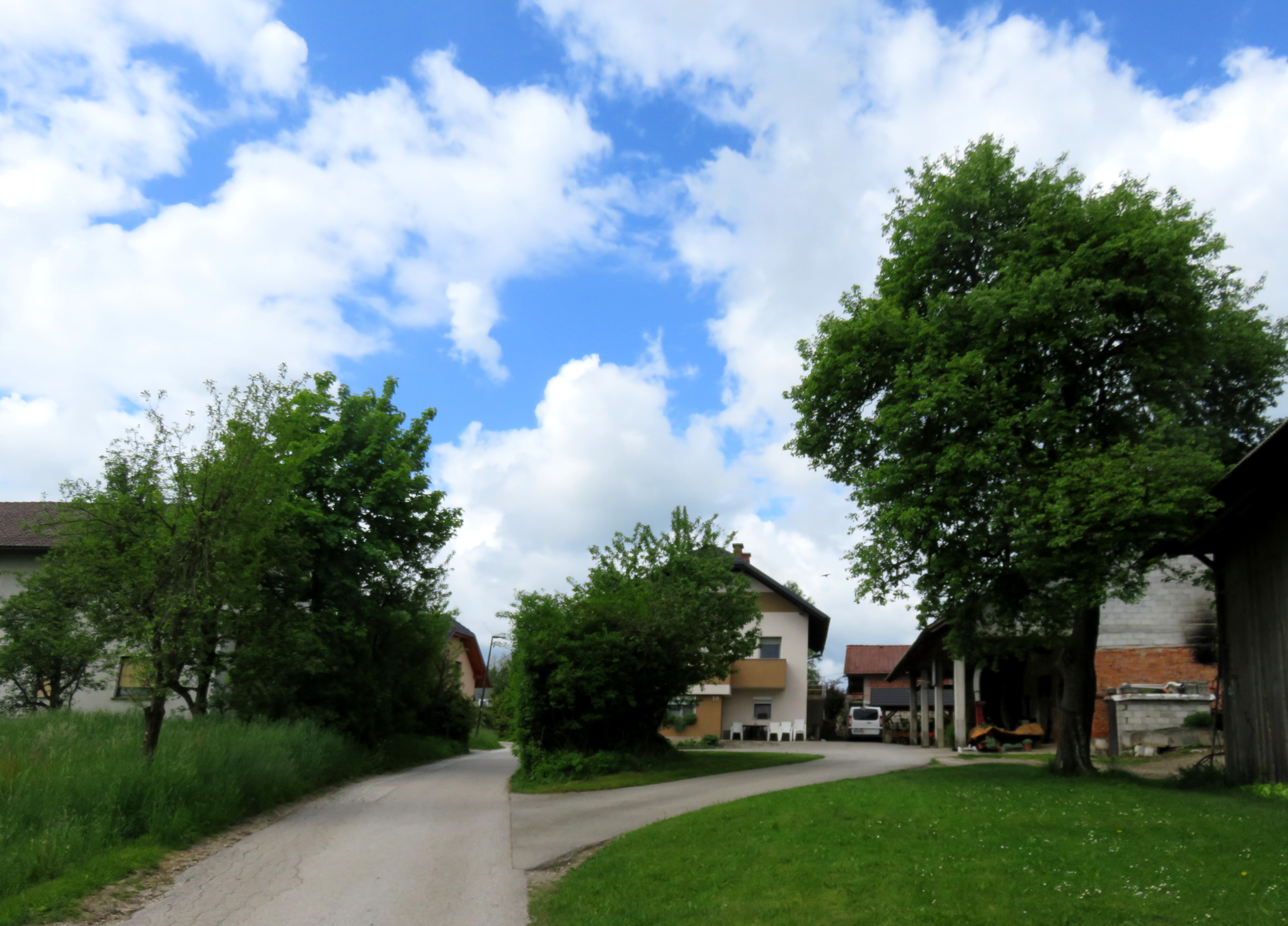

- Location in Slovenia
- Coordinates: 45°56′30″N 14°34′56″E
- Country: Slovenia
- Traditional region: Lower Carniola
- Statistical region: Central Slovenia
- Municipality: Škofljica
- Elevation: 489 m (1,604 ft)

Brezje (pronounced [ˈbɾeːzjɛ], German: Bresie) is a former village in central Slovenia in the Municipality of Škofljica. It is now part of the village of Smrjene. It is part of the traditional region of Lower Carniola and is now included in the Central Slovenia Statistical Region.

== Geography ==
Brezje is a clustered settlement located in the northwest part of the territory of Smrjene, at the top of Brezje Hill (Slovene: Brezovski hrib, elevation: 489 meters or 1,604 feet).

== Name ==
The name Brezje is shared with several other places in Slovenia. It is derived from the Slovene common noun brezje 'birch grove', referring to the local vegetation.

== History ==
Brezje was annexed by Smrjene in 1953, ending its existence as a separate settlement.
