= Lanisce =

Lanisce may refer to:

- Lanišće, a village and municipality in Istria, Croatia
- Lanišče, a village in central Slovenia
