= Reber pri Škofljici =

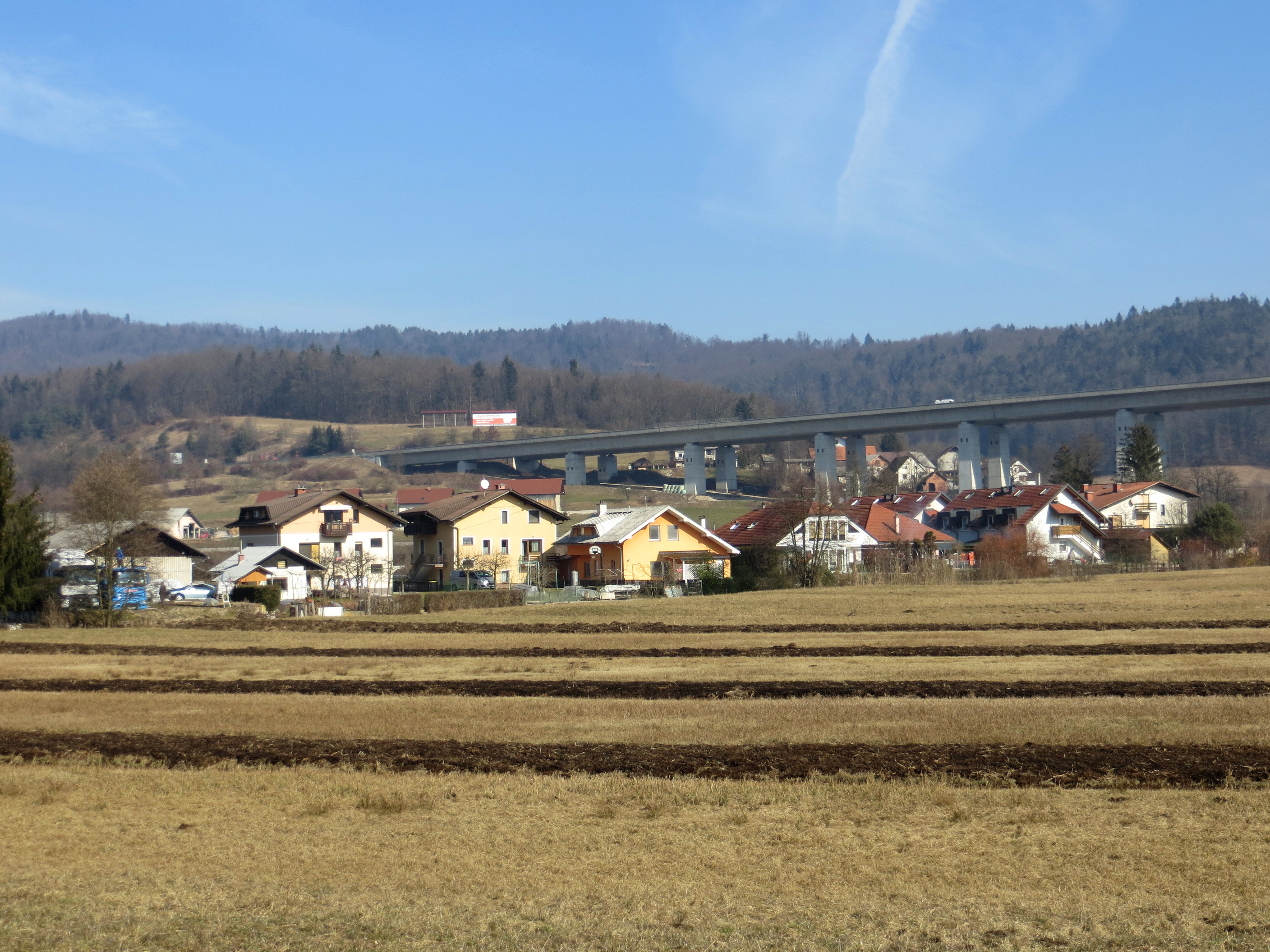

- Location in Slovenia
- Coordinates: 45°59′18.91″N 14°35′49.21″E
- Country: Slovenia
- Traditional region: Lower Carniola
- Statistical region: Central Slovenia
- Municipality: Škofljica

Area
  - Total: 0.77 km^{2} (0.30 sq mi)
- Elevation: 298.6 m (980 ft)

Population (2002)
  - Total: 79
- Postal code: 1291

Reber pri Škofljici (pronounced [ˈɾeːbəɾ pɾi ˈʃkoːfljitsi]) is a small settlement east of Škofljica in central Slovenia. The entire Municipality of Škofljica is part of the traditional region of Lower Carniola and is now included in the Central Slovenia Statistical Region.

== Name ==
The name of the settlement was changed from Reber to Reber pri Škofljici in 1953.
