= Drenik =

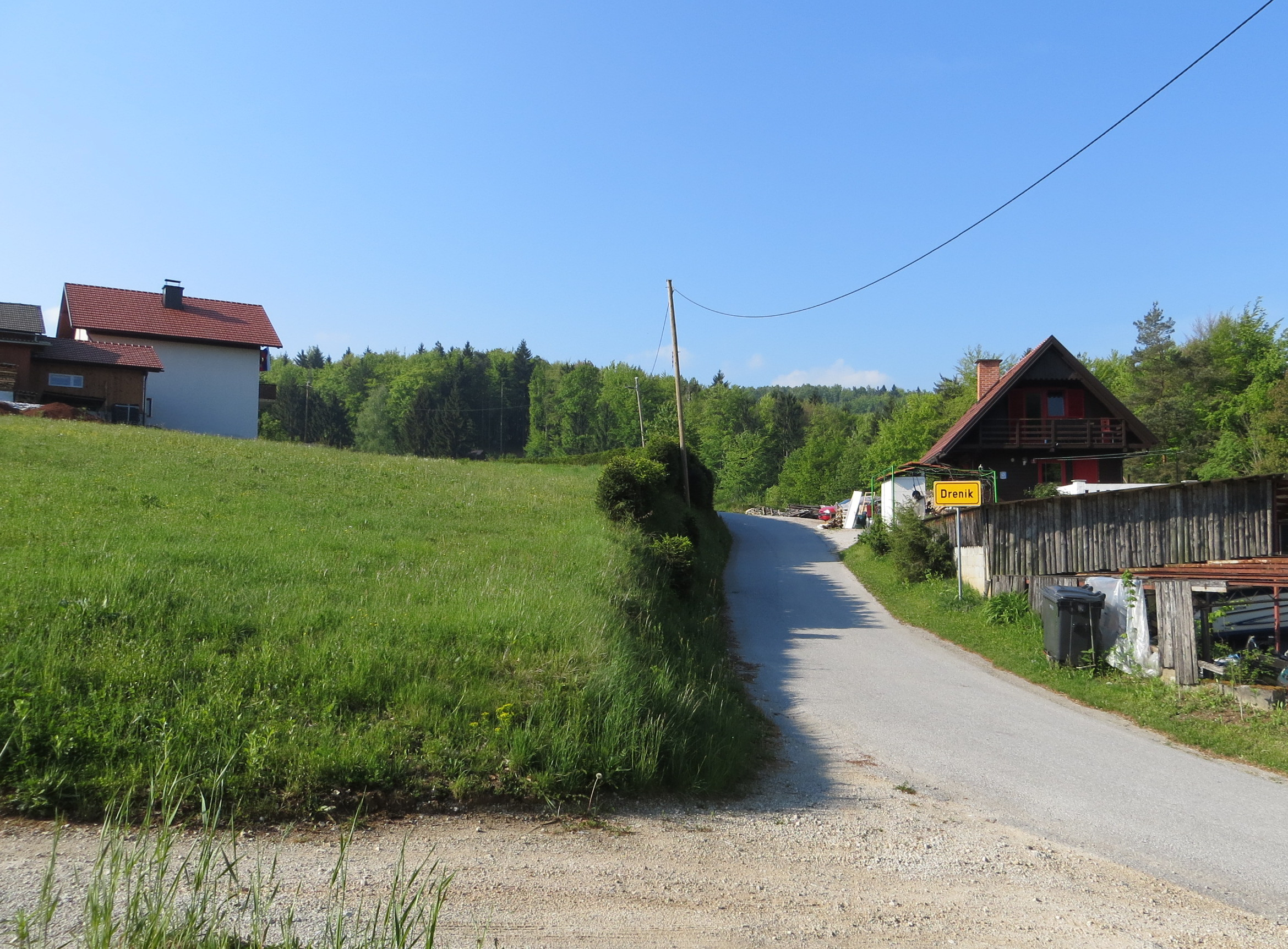

- Location in Slovenia
- Coordinates: 45°56′52.09″N 14°35′26.59″E
- Country: Slovenia
- Traditional region: Lower Carniola
- Statistical region: Central Slovenia
- Municipality: Škofljica

Area
  - Total: 0.88 km^{2} (0.34 sq mi)
- Elevation: 364.5 m (1,196 ft)

Population (2002)
  - Total: 50
- Postal code: 1291

Drenik (pronounced [ˈdɾeːnik]) is a small settlement in the Municipality of Škofljica in central Slovenia. It lies in the hills east of Pijava Gorica. The entire municipality is part of the traditional region of Lower Carniola and is now included in the Central Slovenia Statistical Region.

== Name ==
Drenik was attested in historical sources as Renn in 1321, Drenek in 1370, Dregkch in 1431, and Drëkg and Drenaw in 1436, among other spellings.
