= Dole pri Škofljici =

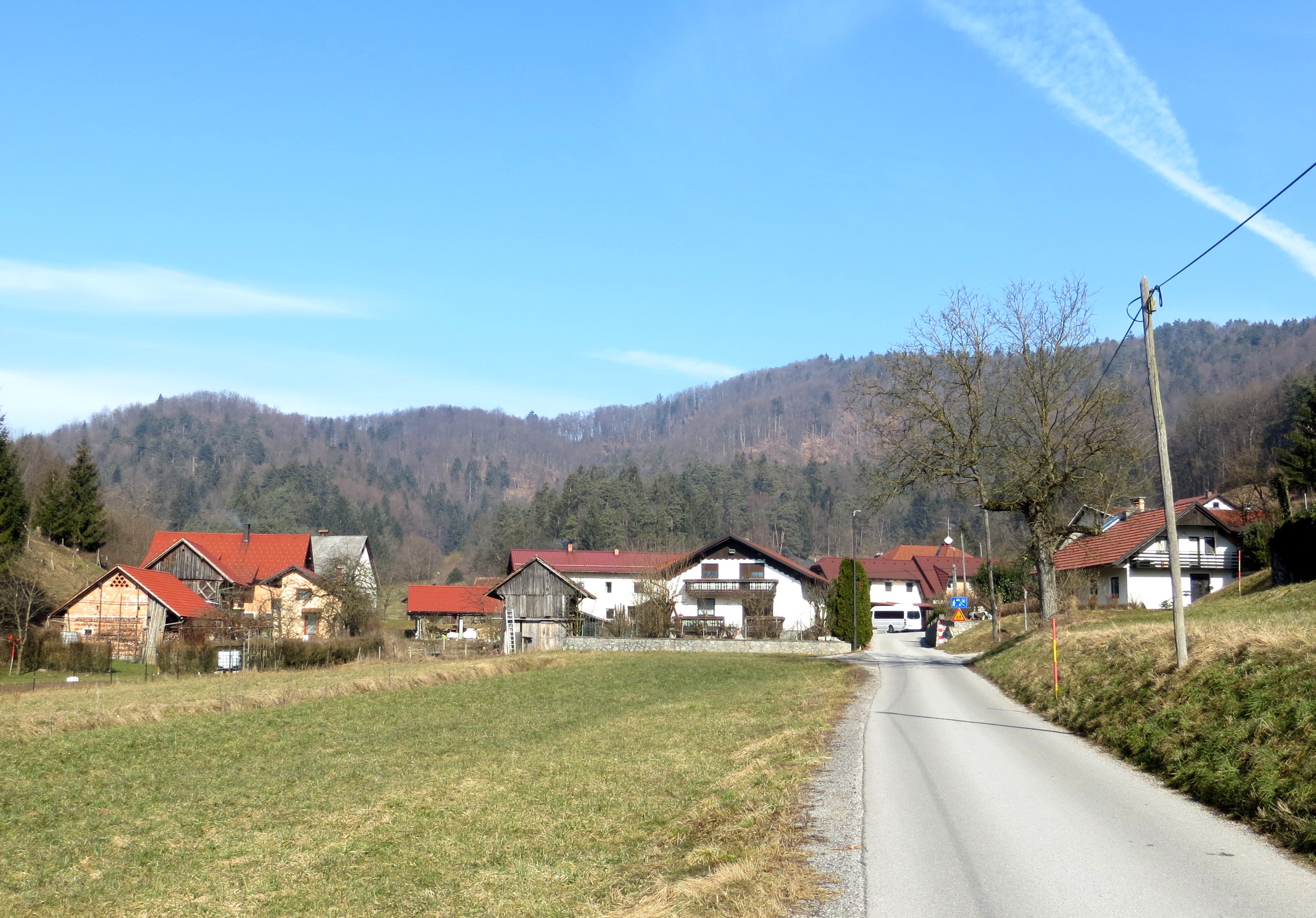

- Location in Slovenia
- Coordinates: 45°59′41.58″N 14°35′49.98″E
- Country: Slovenia
- Traditional region: Lower Carniola
- Statistical region: Central Slovenia
- Municipality: Škofljica

Area
  - Total: 1.12 km^{2} (0.43 sq mi)
- Elevation: 312.4 m (1,025 ft)

Population (2002)
  - Total: 41
- Postal code: 1291

Dole pri Škofljici (pronounced [ˈdoːlɛ pɾi ˈʃkoːfljitsi]; in older sources also Dolje) is a small settlement in the Municipality of Škofljica in central Slovenia. It lies in a small valley east of Škofljica itself. The municipality is part of the traditional region of Lower Carniola and is now included in the Central Slovenia Statistical Region.

== Name ==
The name of the settlement was changed from Dole to Dole pri Škofljici in 1955.
