= Smrjene =

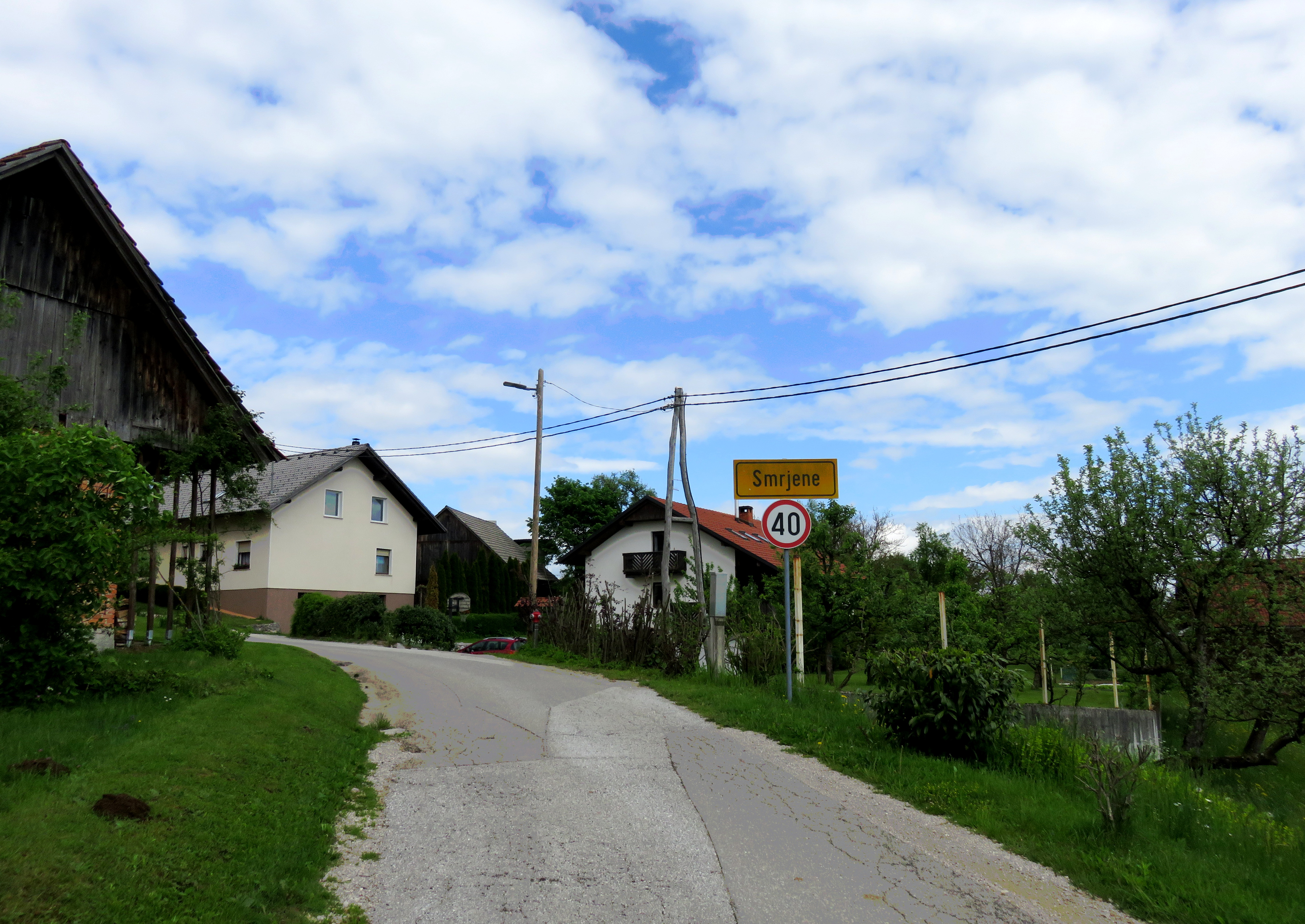

- Location in Slovenia
- Coordinates: 45°55′58.85″N 14°34′54.48″E
- Country: Slovenia
- Traditional region: Lower Carniola
- Statistical region: Central Slovenia
- Municipality: Škofljica

Area
  - Total: 2.23 km^{2} (0.86 sq mi)
- Elevation: 463.8 m (1,522 ft)

Population (2002)
  - Total: 510
- Postal code: 1291

Smrjene (pronounced [ˈsməɾjɛnɛ], in older sources Smrjane or Smerjenje) is a settlement in the hills south of Pijava Gorica in the Municipality of Škofljica in central Slovenia. It is made up of three hamlets: Brezje, Rupnice, and Smrjene. The municipality is part of the traditional region of Lower Carniola and is now included in the Central Slovenia Statistical Region.
