= Zalog pri Škofljici =

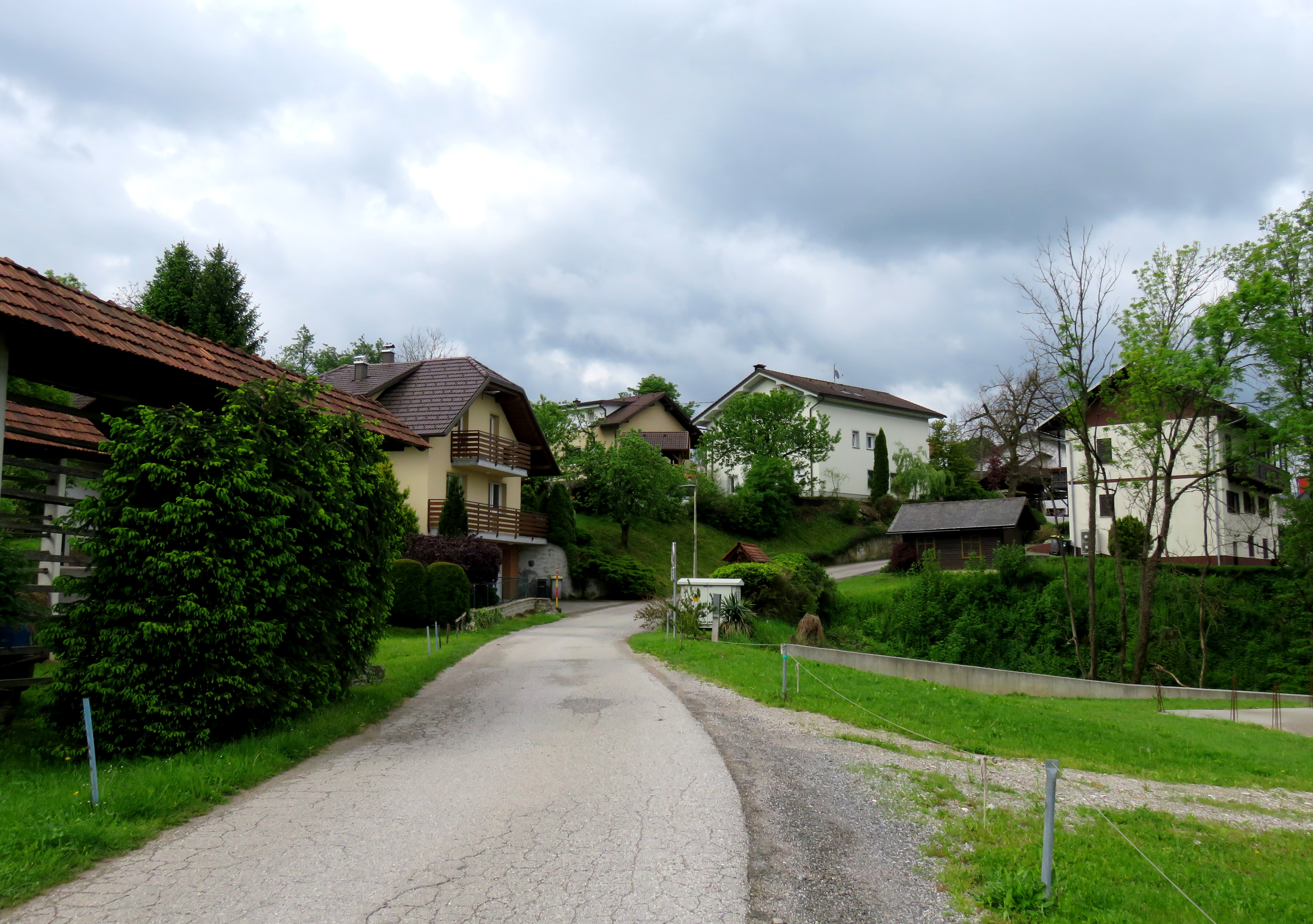

- Location in Slovenia
- Coordinates: 45°58′40.79″N 14°34′49.09″E
- Country: Slovenia
- Traditional region: Lower Carniola
- Statistical region: Central Slovenia
- Municipality: Škofljica

Area
  - Total: 0.72 km^{2} (0.28 sq mi)
- Elevation: 353.3 m (1,159 ft)

Population (2002)
  - Total: 103
- Postal code: 1291

Zalog pri Škofljici (pronounced [ˈzaːlɔk pɾi ˈʃkoːfljitsi]; German: Saloch) is a settlement south of Škofljica in central Slovenia. The Municipality of Škofljica is part of the traditional region of Lower Carniola and is now included in the Central Slovenia Statistical Region.

== Name ==
The name of the settlement was changed from Zalog to Zalog pri Škofljici in 1955. In the past it was known as Saloch in German.

== Cultural heritage ==
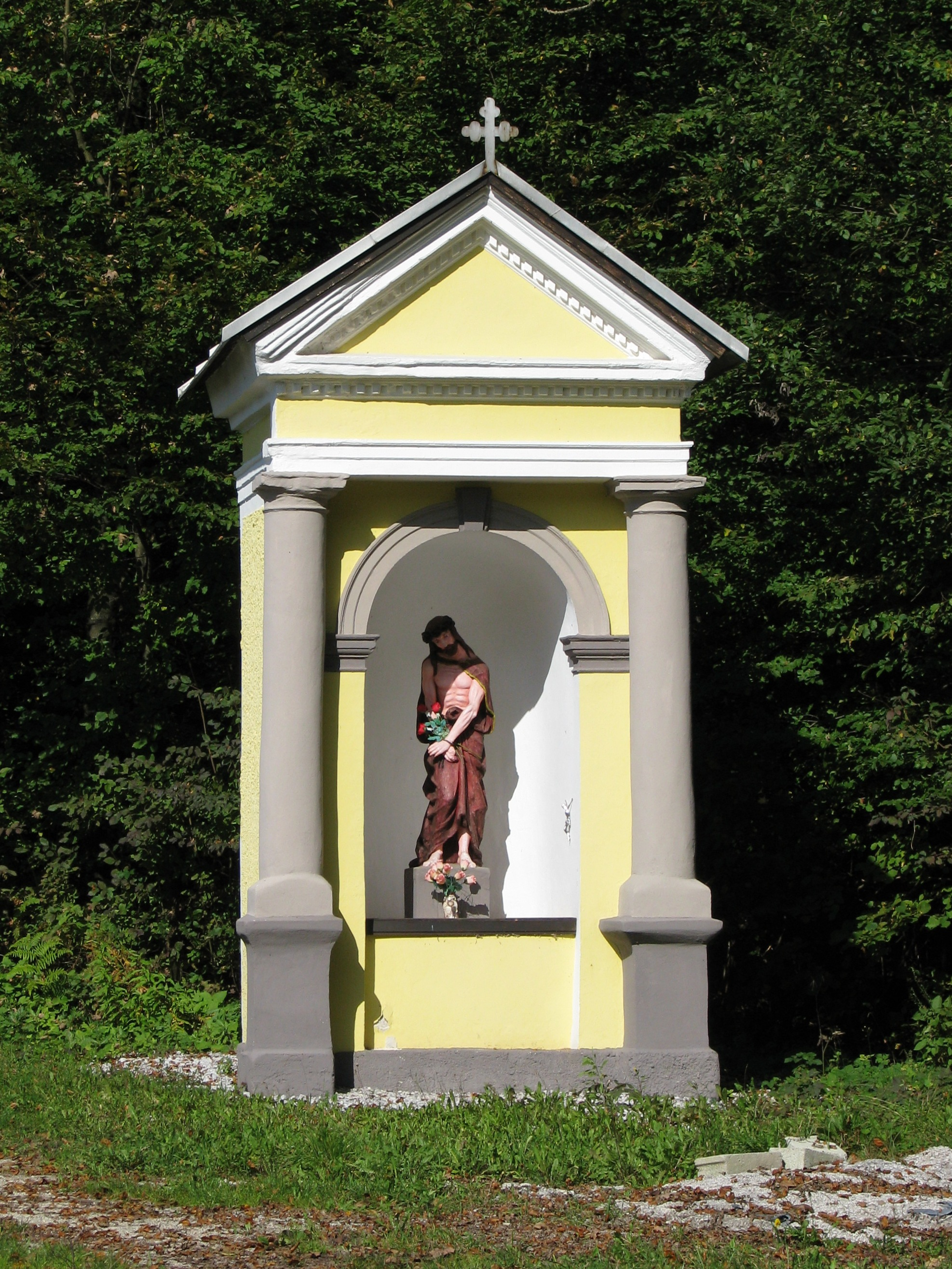
The French Chapel-Shrine is a memorial to French soldiers fallen in the Combat at St. Marein during the Napoleonic wars.

A small chapel-shrine in the settlement, named the French Chapel-Shrine (Slovene: Francoska kapelica), was erected in the 19th century (by tradition, in 1813) in memory of French soldiers who died in the Combat at St. Marein during the Napoleonic campaign in the Balkans.
