= Lanišče =

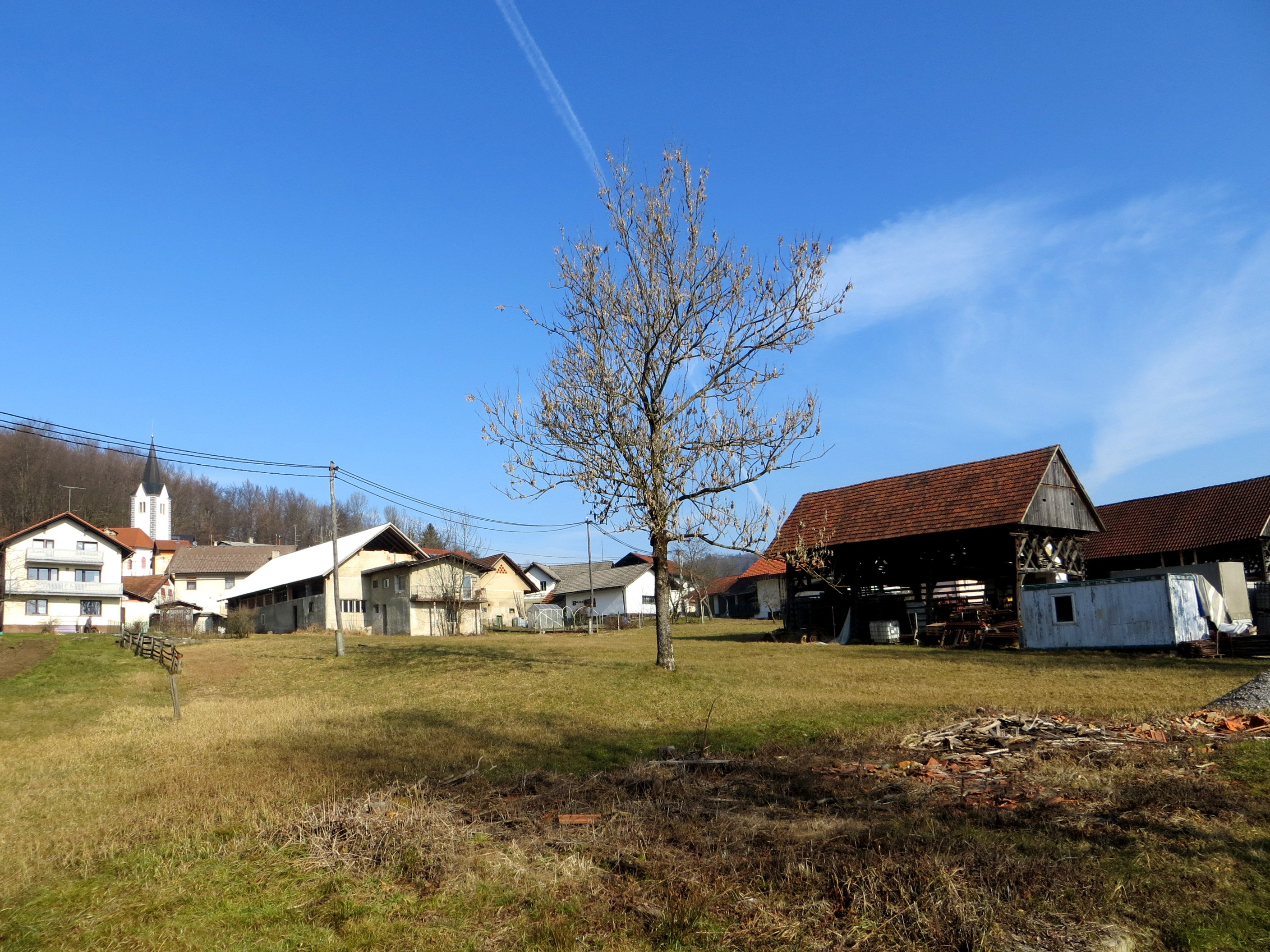

- Location in Slovenia
- Coordinates: 45°59′25″N 14°35′04″E
- Country: Slovenia
- Traditional region: Lower Carniola
- Statistical region: Central Slovenia
- Municipality: Škofljica

Area
  - Total: 1.15 km^{2} (0.44 sq mi)
- Elevation: 319.7 m (1,049 ft)

Population (2002)
  - Total: 228
- Postal code: 1291

Lanišče (pronounced [laˈniːʃtʃɛ]; German: Lanische) is a settlement immediately east of Škofljica in central Slovenia. The Municipality of Škofljica is part of the traditional region of Lower Carniola and is now included in the Central Slovenia Statistical Region. It includes the hamlet of Lisičje (German: Gairau).

== Lisičje Manor ==
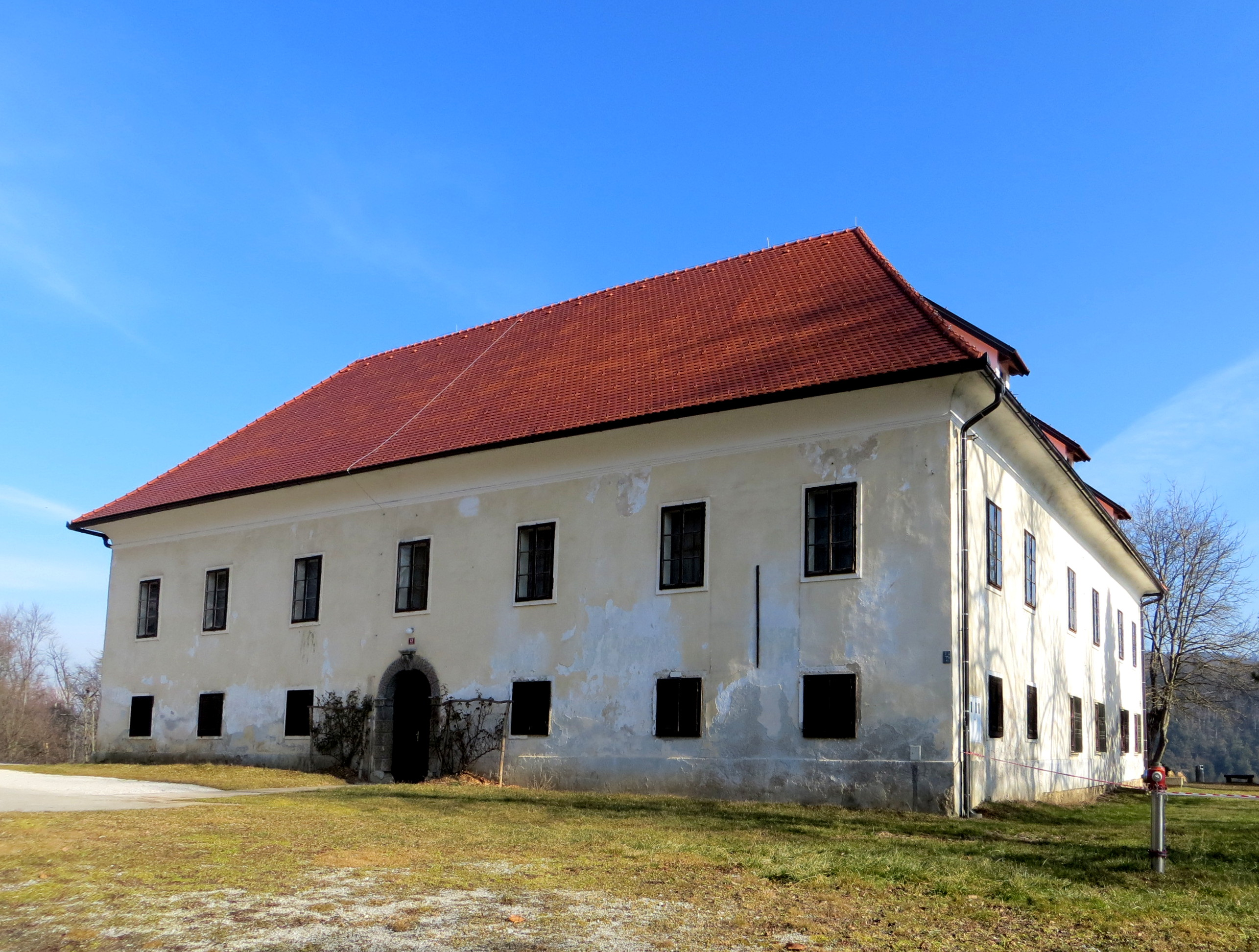
Lisičje Manor

Lisičje Manor stands in the hamlet of Lisičje, northwest of the village center. The building dates from 1560 and its first known owner was Lenart Merharič. The castle was renovated in the 17th century and a castle garden was created by Lenart Fabjančič-Merharič. Before the Second World War, the castle, which contained an extensive library and valuable paintings, was owned by the Englishwoman Mary Lloyd. Later soldiers were quartered in the building, and after the war it was taken over by the Slovene Ethnographic Museum.

== Church ==
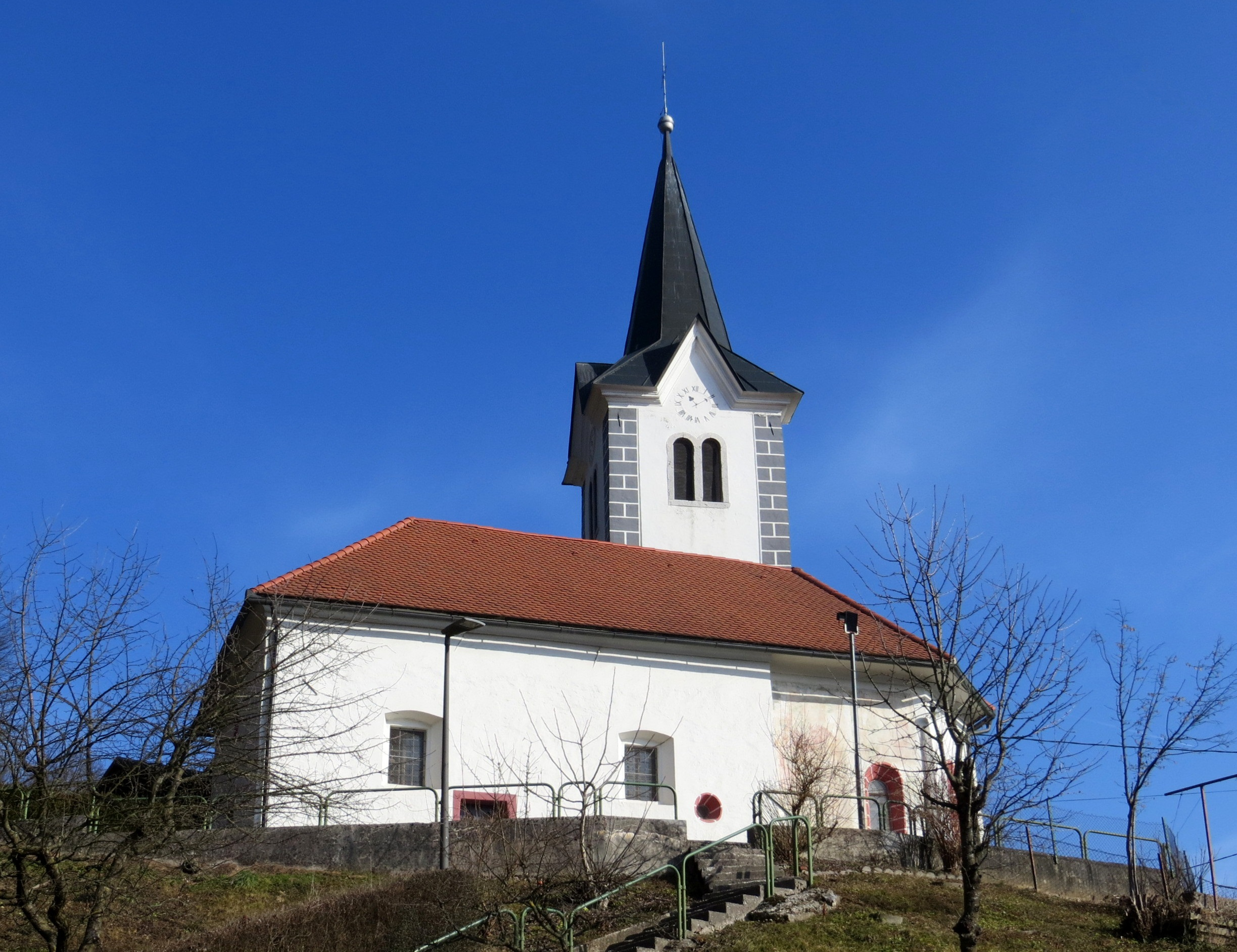
Saint Ursula's Church

The local church is dedicated to Saint Ursula and belongs to the Parish of Škofljica. It is a 14th-century Gothic building. Fragments of early 15th- and 16th-century frescos are preserved on its interior walls.
