= Municipality of Škofljica =

Municipality of Škofljica Občina Škofljica
- Municipality
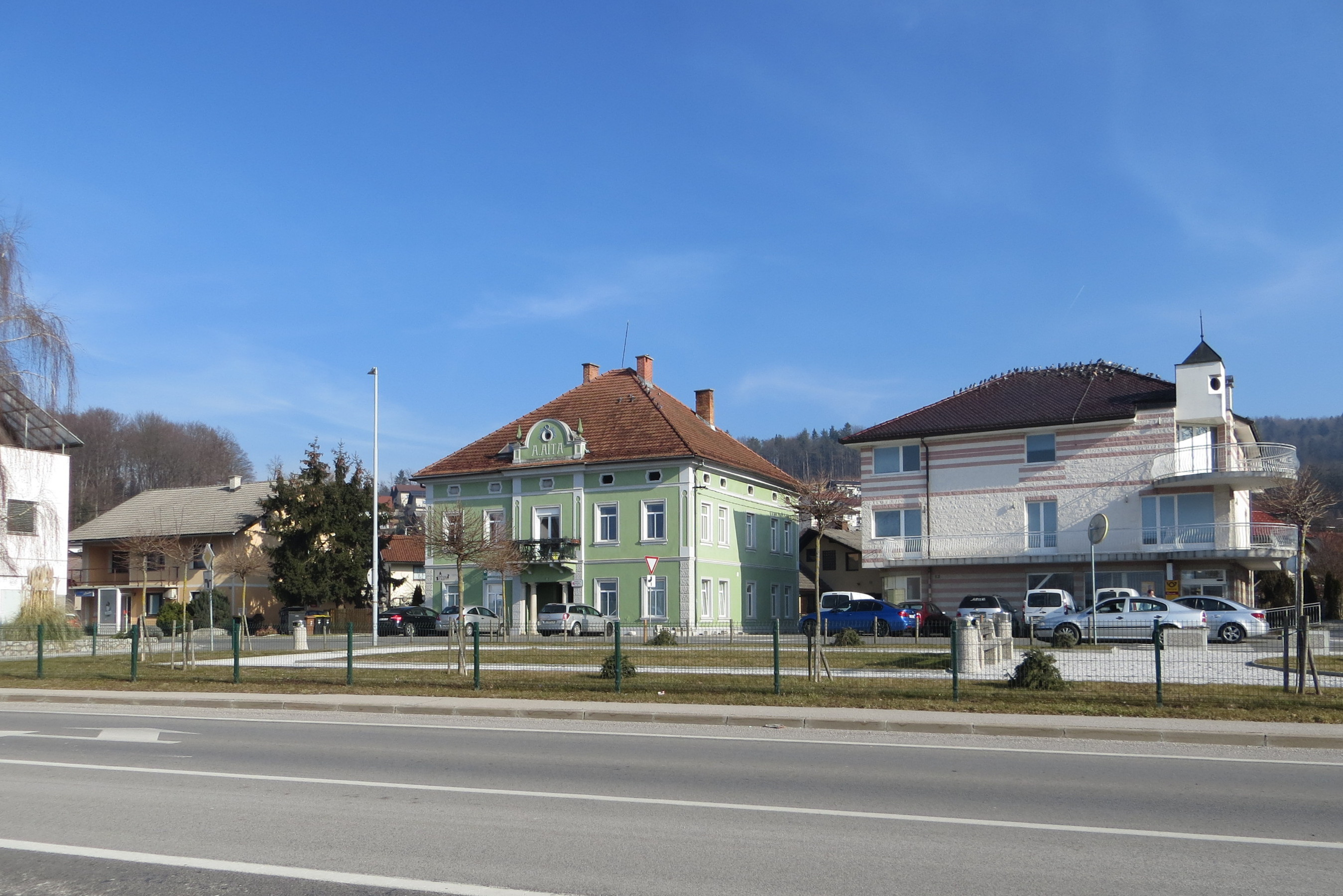

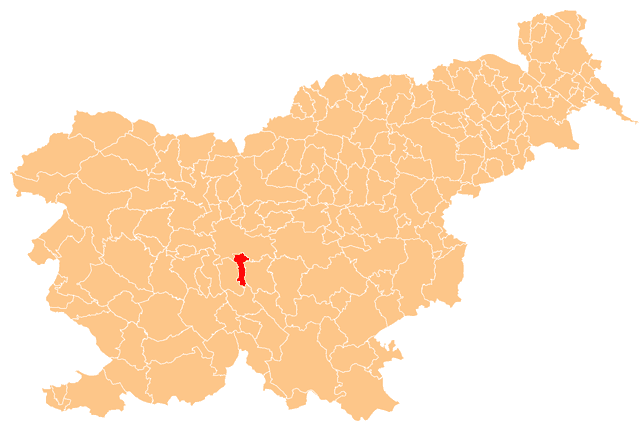
- Location of the Municipality of Škofljica in Slovenia
- Coordinates: 45°57′10″N 14°34′23″E
- Country: Slovenia

Government
  - Mayor: Primož Cimerman

Area
  - Total: 43.3 km^{2} (16.7 sq mi)

Population (2023)
  - Total: 11,897
  - Density: 275/km^{2} (712/sq mi)
- Time zone: UTC+01 (CET)
  - Summer (DST): UTC+02 (CEST)
- Website: www.skofljica.si

The Municipality of Škofljica (pronounced [ˈʃkoːfljitsa]; Slovene: Občina Škofljica) is a municipality in central Slovenia. The seat of the municipality is the town of Škofljica. It lies just south of the capital Ljubljana in the traditional region of Lower Carniola. It is now included in the Central Slovenia Statistical Region.

== Settlements ==
In addition to the municipal seat of Škofljica, the municipality also includes the following settlements:

- Dole pri Škofljici
- Drenik
- Glinek
- Gorenje Blato
- Gradišče
- Gumnišče
- Klada
- Lanišče
- Lavrica
- Orle
- Pijava Gorica
- Pleše
- Reber pri Škofljici
- Smrjene
- Vrh nad Želimljami
- Zalog pri Škofljici
- Želimlje
