= Želimlje =

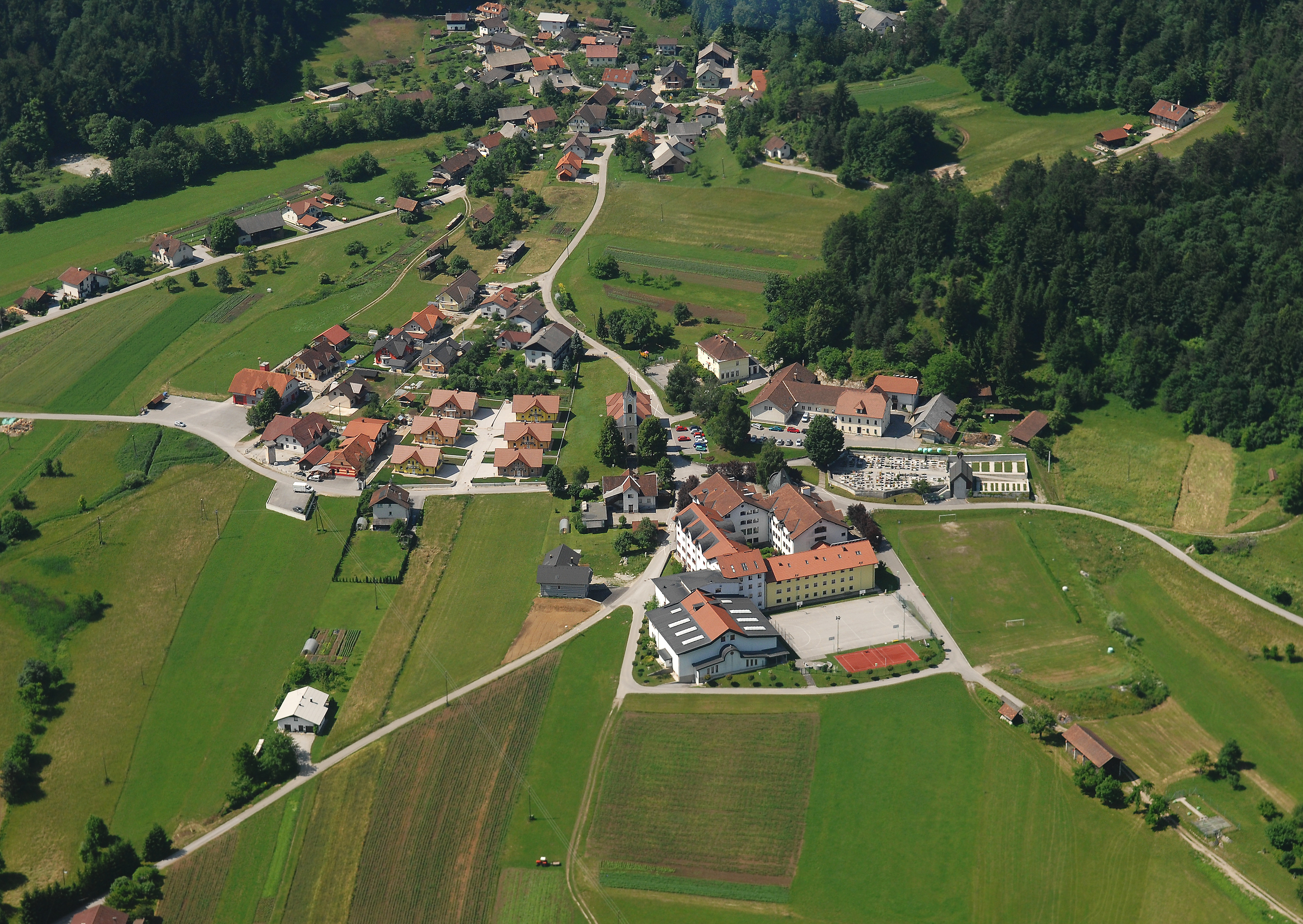
- Aerial view of Želimlje

- Location in Slovenia
- Coordinates: 45°55′0.07″N 14°34′13.62″E
- Country: Slovenia
- Traditional region: Lower Carniola
- Statistical region: Central Slovenia
- Municipality: Škofljica

Area
  - Total: 7.45 km^{2} (2.88 sq mi)
- Elevation: 335.7 m (1,101 ft)

Population (2002)
  - Total: 358
- Postal code: 1291

Želimlje (pronounced [ʒɛˈliːmljɛ]; German: Schelimle) is a settlement in the Municipality of Škofljica in central Slovenia. The municipality is part of the traditional region of Lower Carniola and is now included in the Central Slovenia Statistical Region.

== Geography ==
Želimlje includes the hamlets of Brezovica, Kopija (German: Kopinhof), Kurja Vas, Namršelj (German: Hammerstiel), Pleše, Podreber, Poljane (German: Wiesenhof), Rogovila, Škopačnik, and Trnje, as well as various isolated farmsteads. The remnants of Namršelj Manor (German: Hammerstill), with elements from the 16th, 17th, and 18th centuries, stand in Namršelj. Želimeljščica Creek, a tributary of the Iščica River, flows north through the settlement.

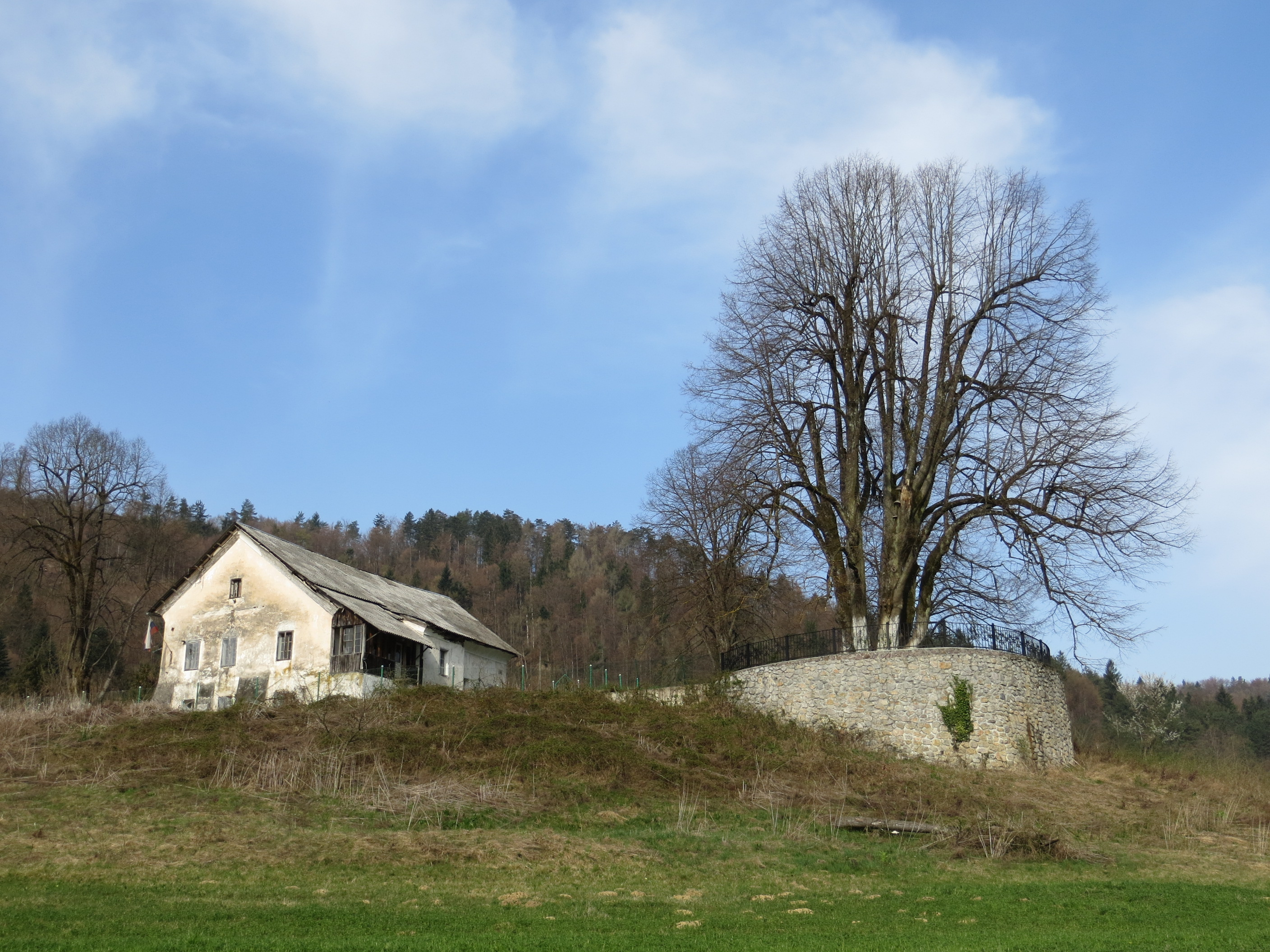
Namršelj

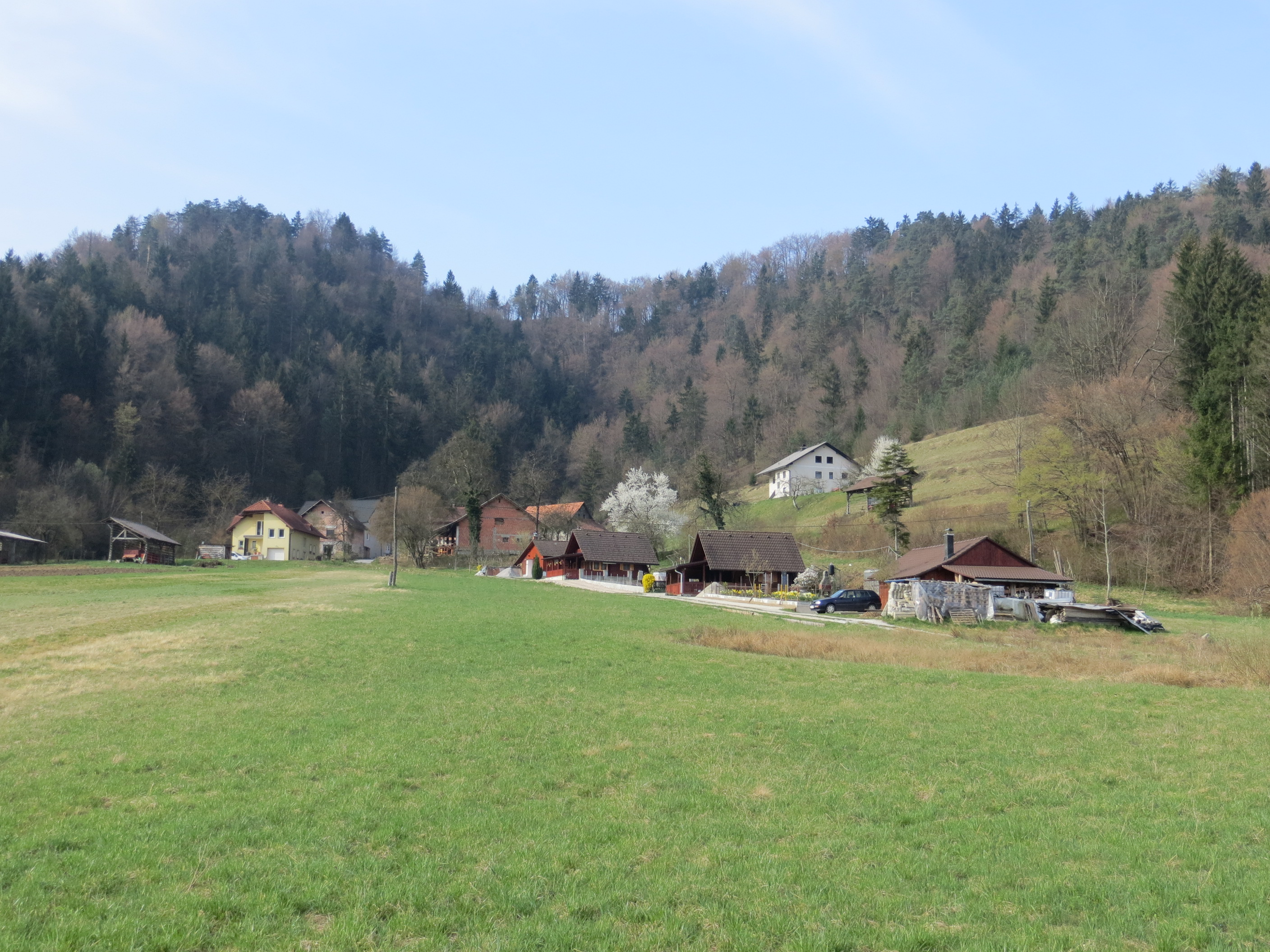
Pleše

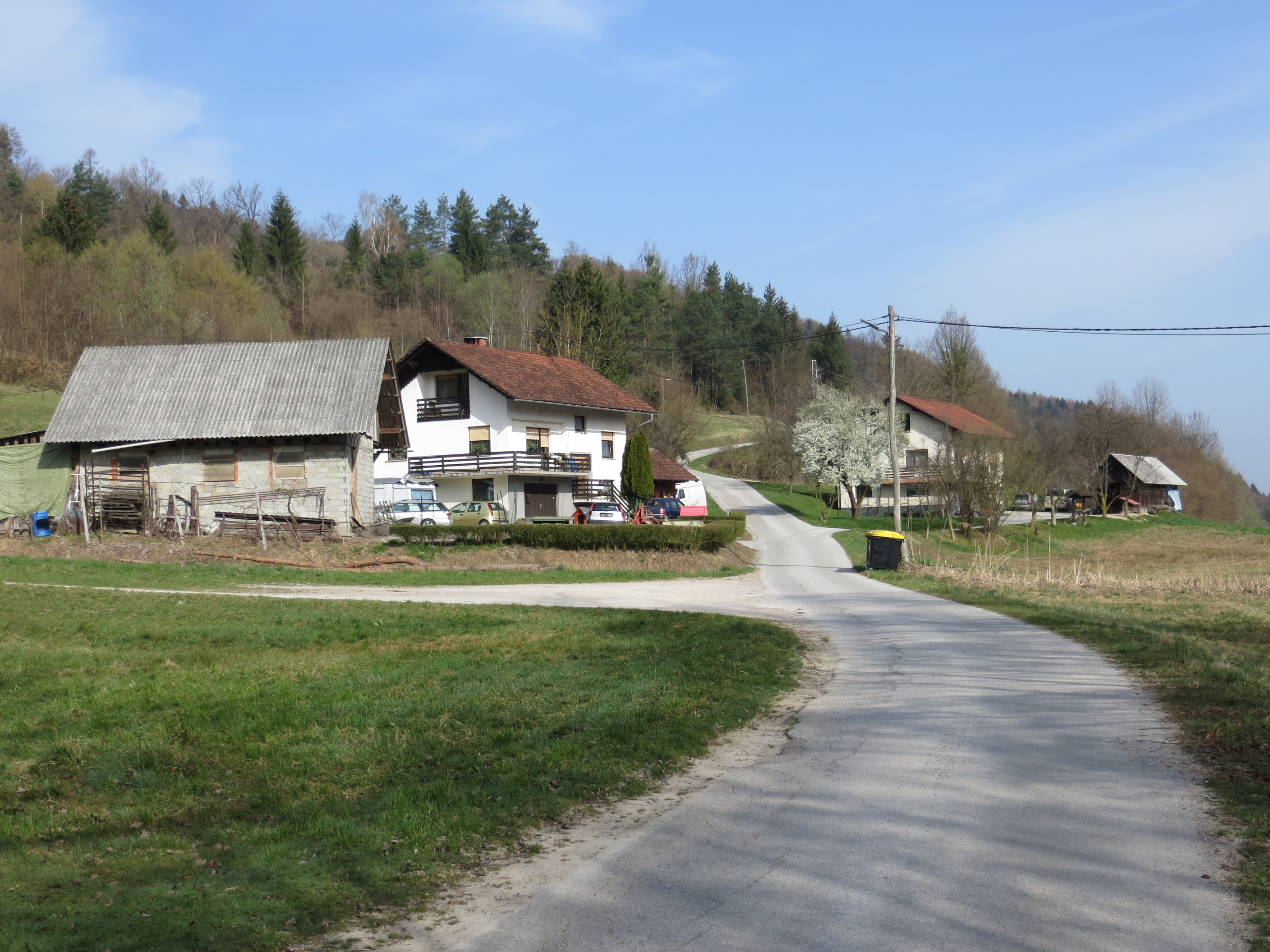
Skopačnik

Hamlets of Želimlje

== Name ==
Želimlje was attested in written sources in 1300 as Schelein (and as Salein in 1318 and 1326, Zelein in 1321, and Seleym in 1436). The name is originally a possessive adjective, shortened from *Želimľe (selo) (literally, 'Želimъ's village'). Today the name is declined either as a neuter singular adjective (Želímlje -ega) or as a feminine plural noun (Želímlje -melj). The originally neuter singular adjective was reanalyzed as an accusative plural, and then as a feminine nominative plural. The personal name Želimъ is a hypocorism from a name such as *Želimirъ, preserved today in the Slovene name Željko.

== Church ==
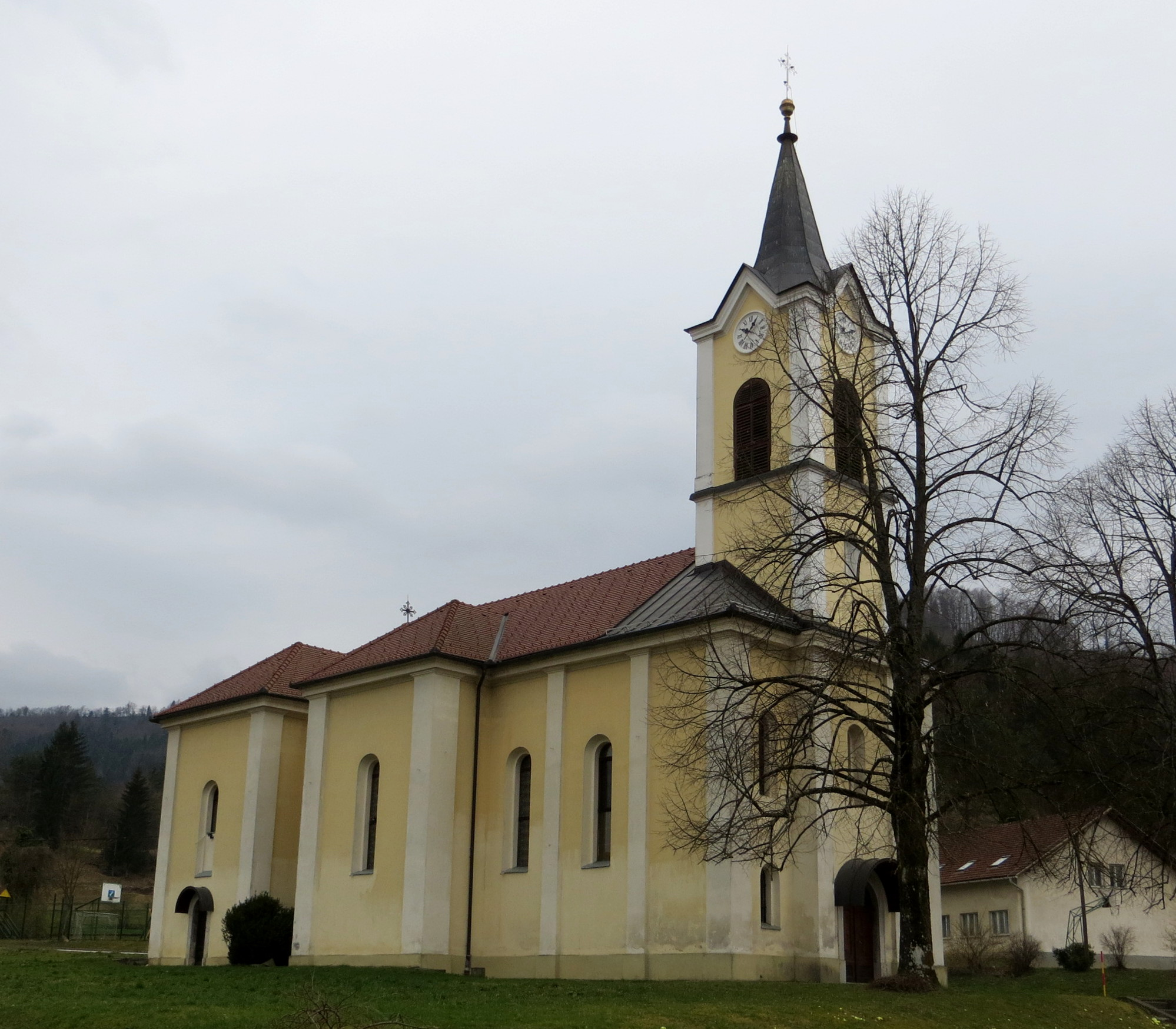
Saint Vitus's Church

The local parish church is dedicated to Saint Vitus and belongs to the Roman Catholic Archdiocese of Ljubljana. It was built between 1882 and 1884.

== Notable people ==
Notable people that were born or lived in Želimlje include:

- Fran Saleški Finžgar (1871–1962), writer
- Anton Lesjak (1857–1942), historian
- Mihael Levstik (1861–1939), orchard expert
- Lovro Mencinger (a.k.a. Golski, 1835–1903), orchardist
- Josip Schaut (died 1922), forestry expert and Auersberg estate manager
