= Pijava Gorica =

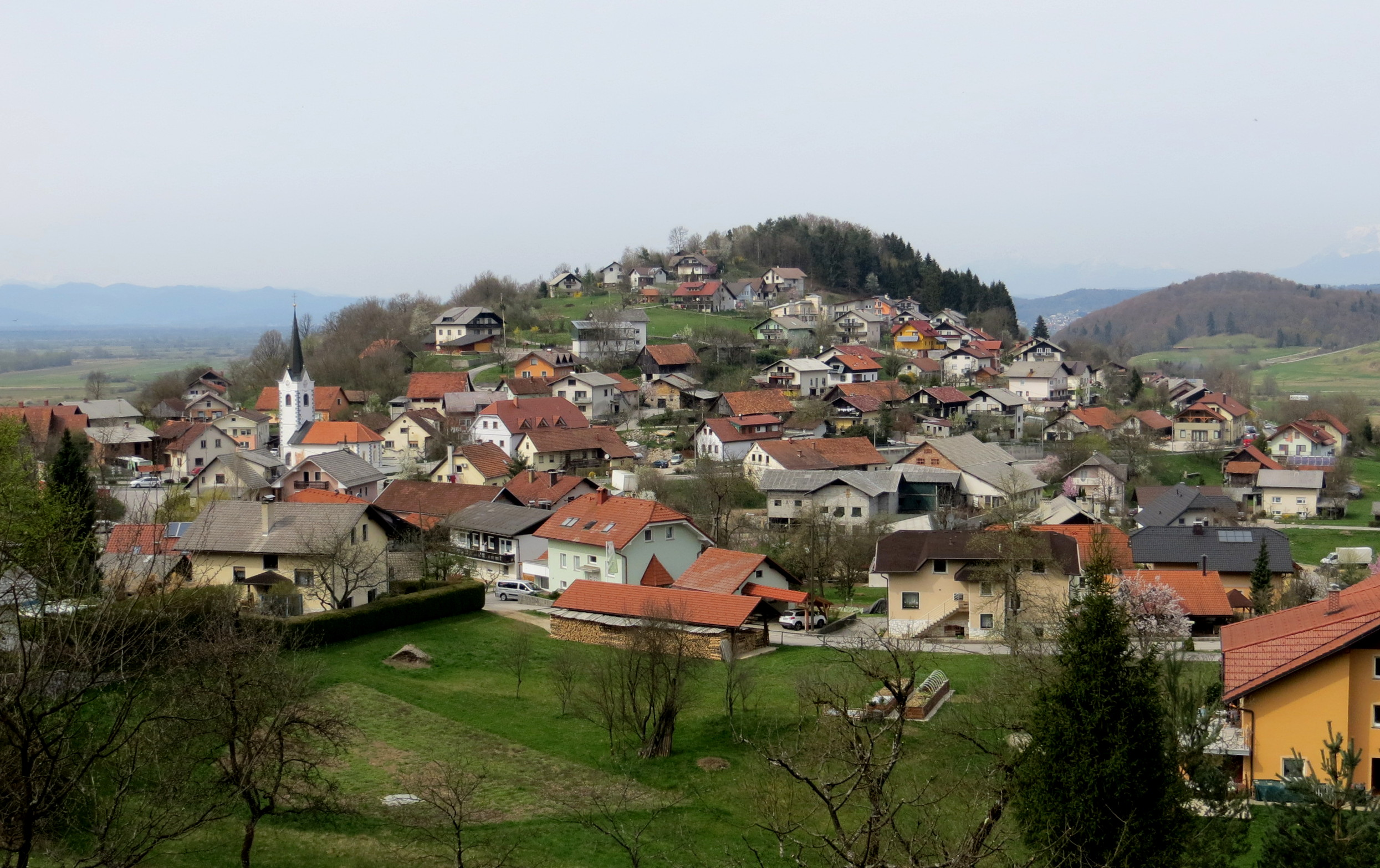

- Location in Slovenia
- Coordinates: 45°57′10″N 14°34′22.83″E
- Country: Slovenia
- Traditional region: Lower Carniola
- Statistical region: Central Slovenia
- Municipality: Škofljica

Area
  - Total: 3.68 km^{2} (1.42 sq mi)
- Elevation: 326.8 m (1,072 ft)

Population (2002)
  - Total: 669
- Postal code: 1291

Pijava Gorica (pronounced [piˈjaːʋa ɡɔˈɾiːtsa]; German: Piautzbüchel) is a settlement in the Municipality of Škofljica in central Slovenia. It lies on the edge of the marshland south of the capital Ljubljana. The municipality is part of the traditional region of Lower Carniola and is now included in the Central Slovenia Statistical Region.

== Name ==
Pijava Gorica was attested in written sources circa 1356 as Pieczpühel (and as Pyaweczpüchel in 1365, Pyawiczpühel in 1380, Piatzpuchel in 1463, Pyauitschpuhel in 1467, and Pyabicz puechell in 1490). The medieval attestations indicate that the Slovene name was originally *Pijavča gorica or *Pijavič(j)a gorica. The first element is probably a possessive adjective based on the estate name Pijavec, referring to a property where water sinks into the ground. This may refer to Trstje Creek east of Pijava Hill (Slovene: Pijavski hrib). The second element, gorica, means 'hill' in Slovene, and so the name literally means 'Pijavec hill' (or 'hill near the place where water sinks into the ground'). In the past the German name was Piautzbüchel.

== Church ==
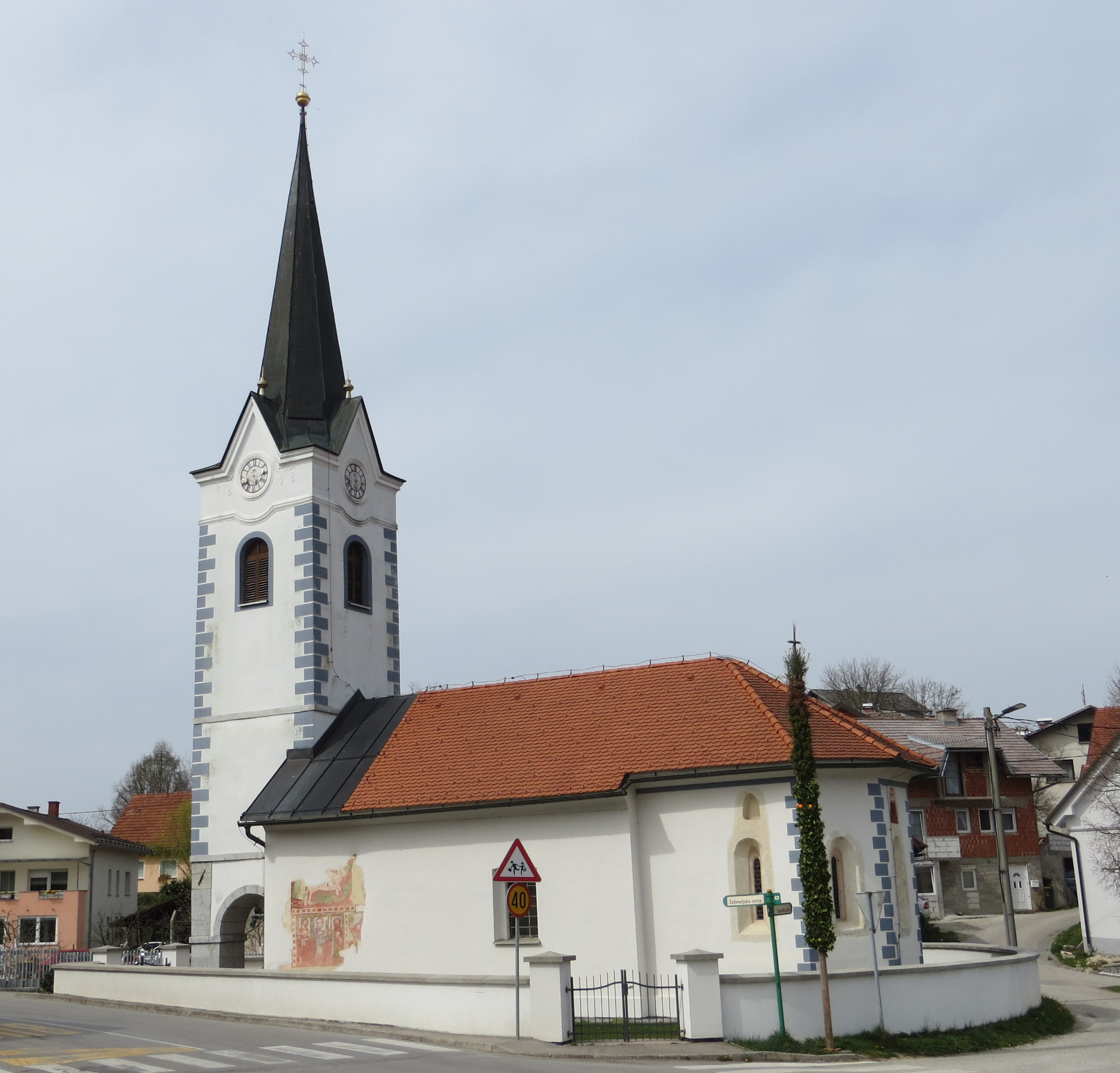
View from south

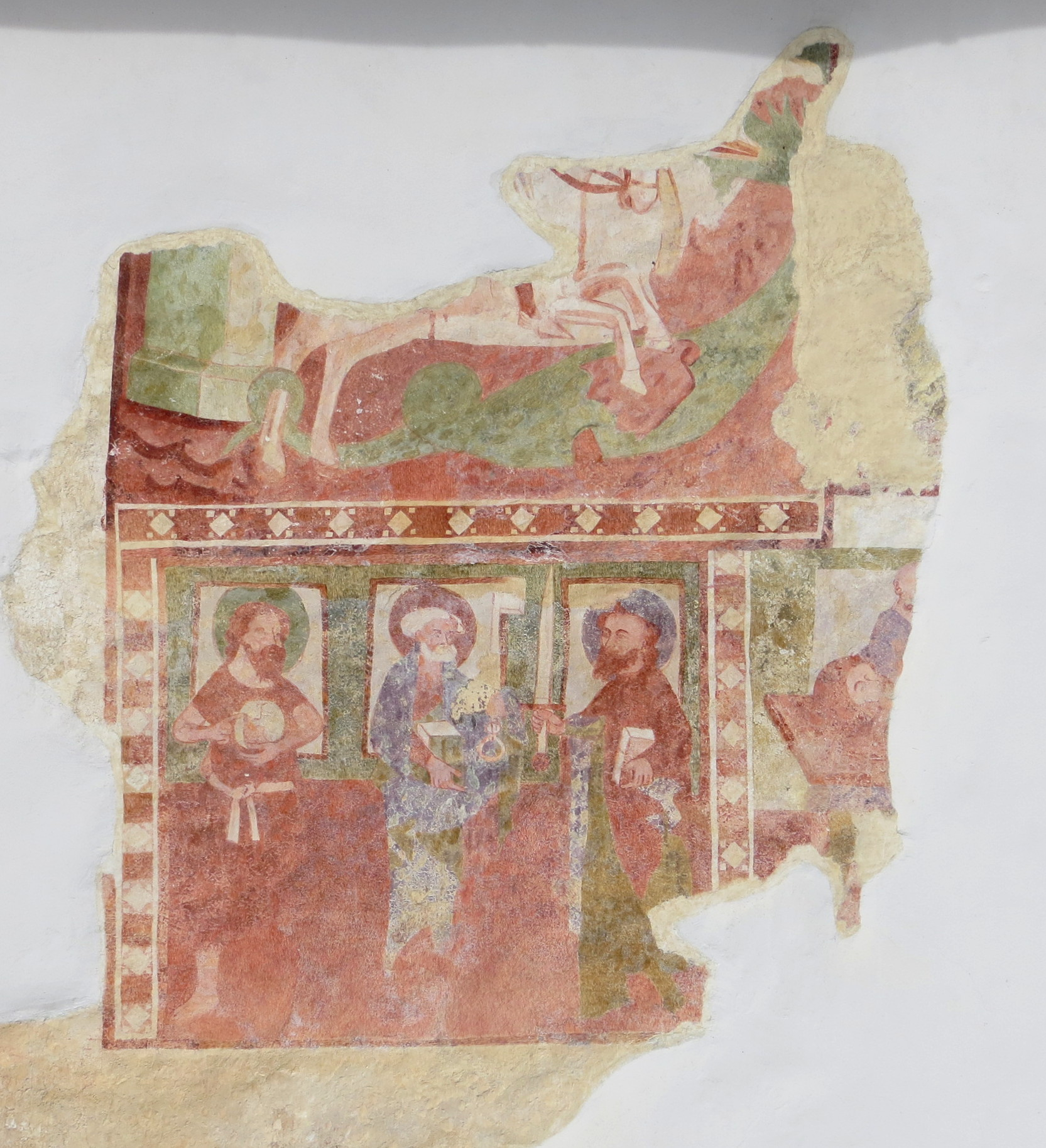
Exterior fresco

Saints Simon and Jude Church

The local church is dedicated to Saint Simon and Saint Jude and belongs to the Parish of Ig. It is a 15th-century Gothic building that was extended in the 17th century.
