= Škofljica =

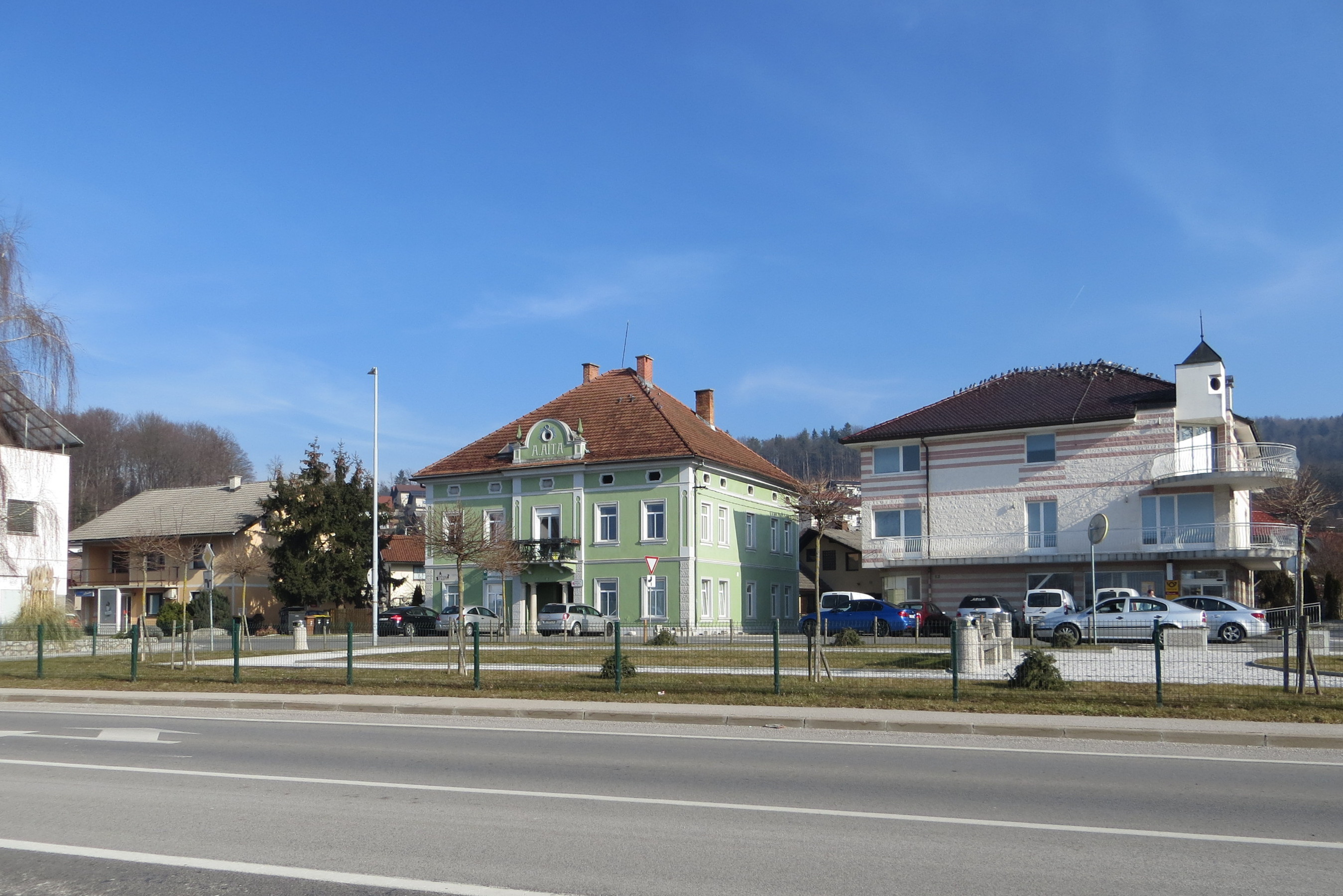

- Location in Slovenia
- Coordinates: 45°59′01″N 14°34′34″E
- Country: Slovenia
- Traditional region: Lower Carniola
- Statistical region: Central Slovenia
- Municipality: Škofljica

Area
  - Total: 4.55 km^{2} (1.76 sq mi)
- Elevation: 300 m (980 ft)

Population (2023)
  - Total: 3,029
- Postal code: 1291

Škofljica (pronounced [ˈʃkoːfljitsa]; German: Geweihtenbrunn) is a settlement in central Slovenia. It is the seat of the Municipality of Škofljica. It lies on the eastern edge of the marshlands south of the capital Ljubljana. The entire municipality is part of the traditional region of Lower Carniola and is now included in the Central Slovenia Statistical Region.

== Church ==
The parish church in the settlement is dedicated to Saints Cyril and Methodius and belongs to the Roman Catholic Archdiocese of Ljubljana. It is a modern building built in 1986.

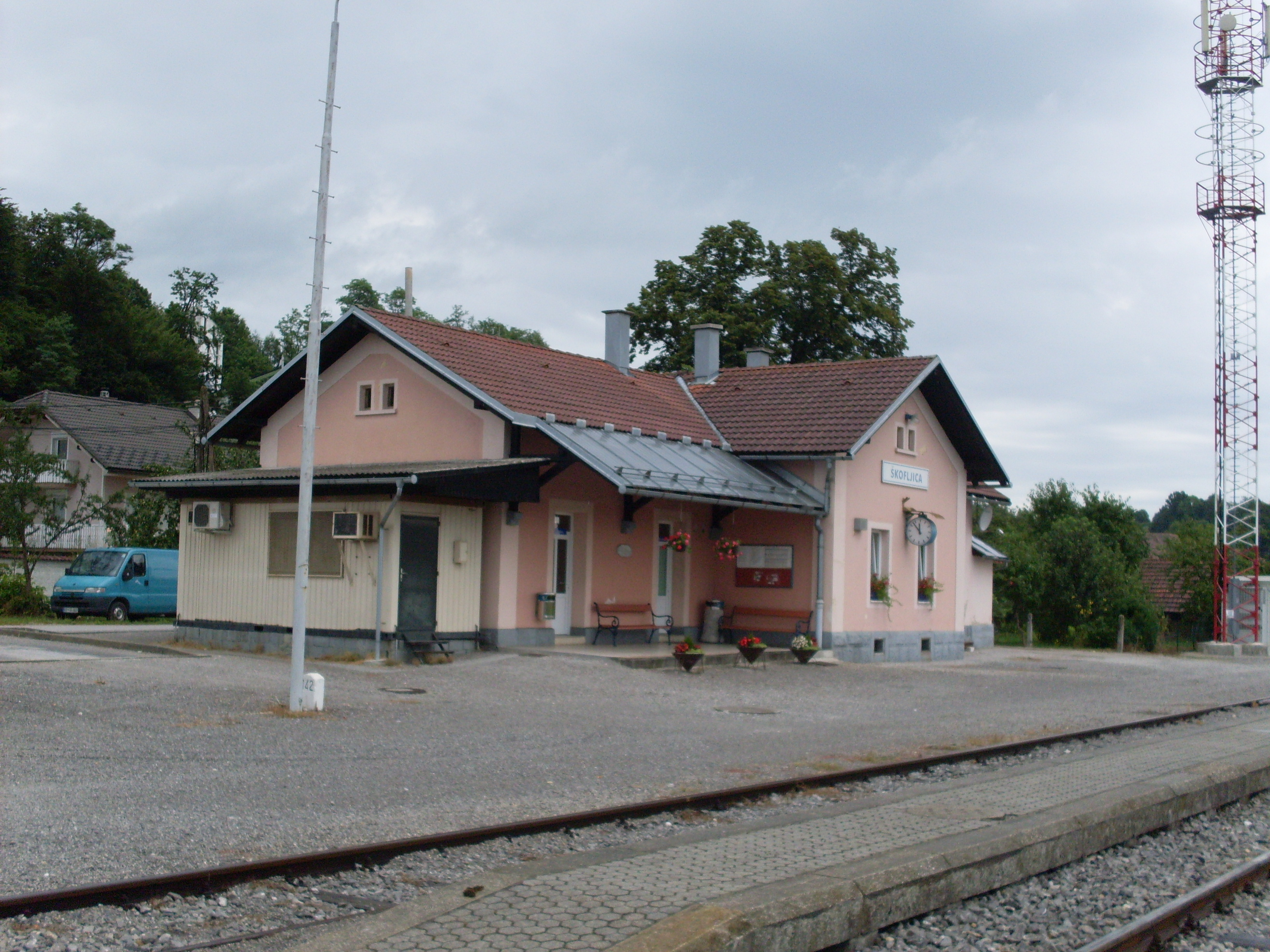
Train station in Škofljica

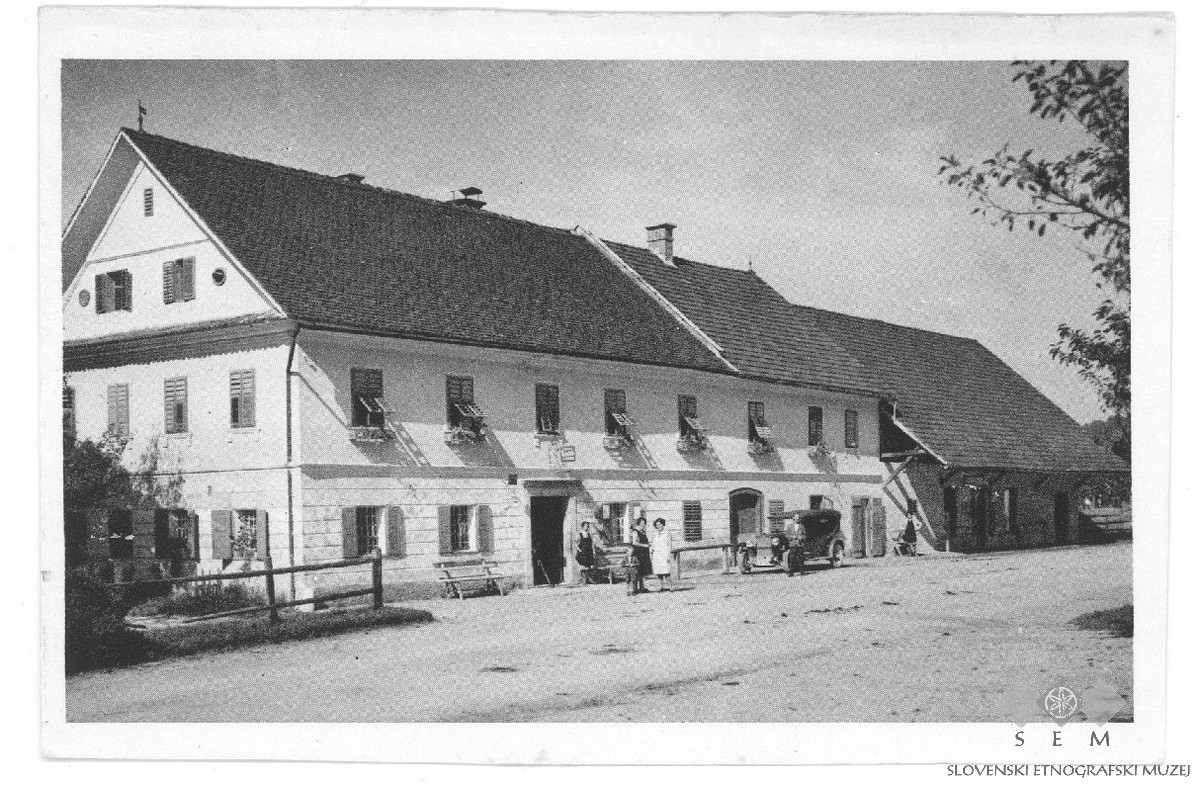
Postcard of Škofljica

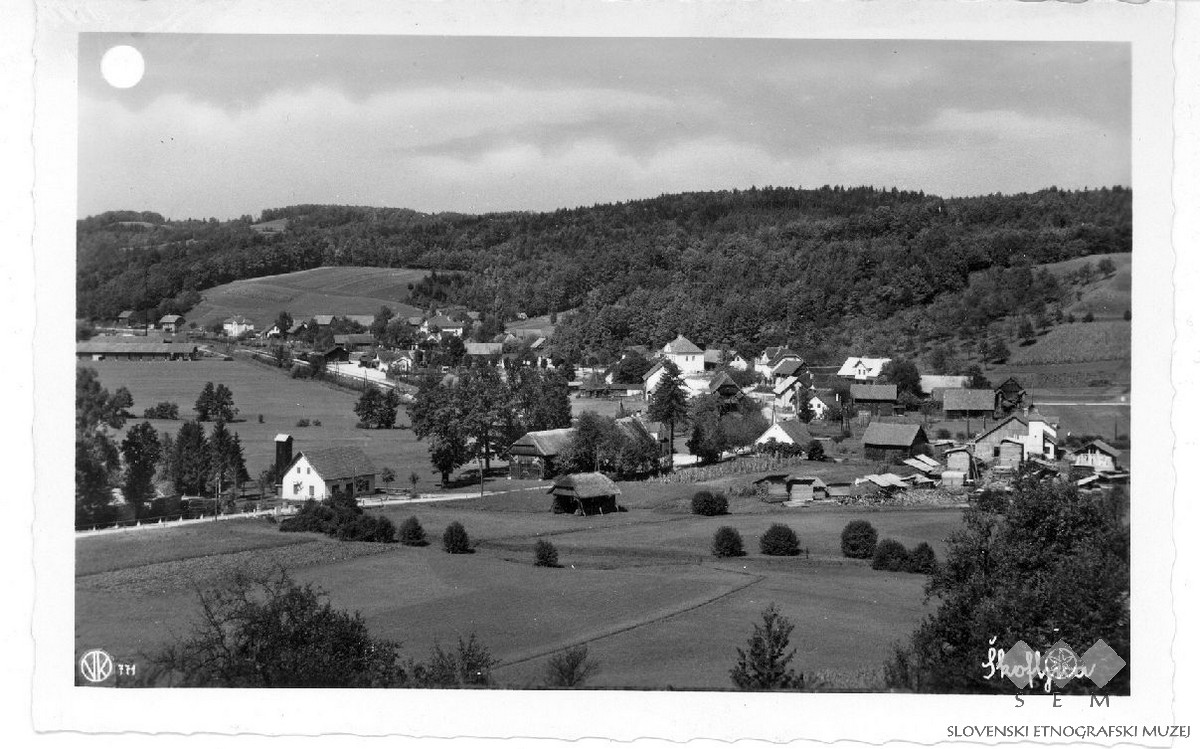
Postcard of Škofljica
