= Spodnje Ribče =

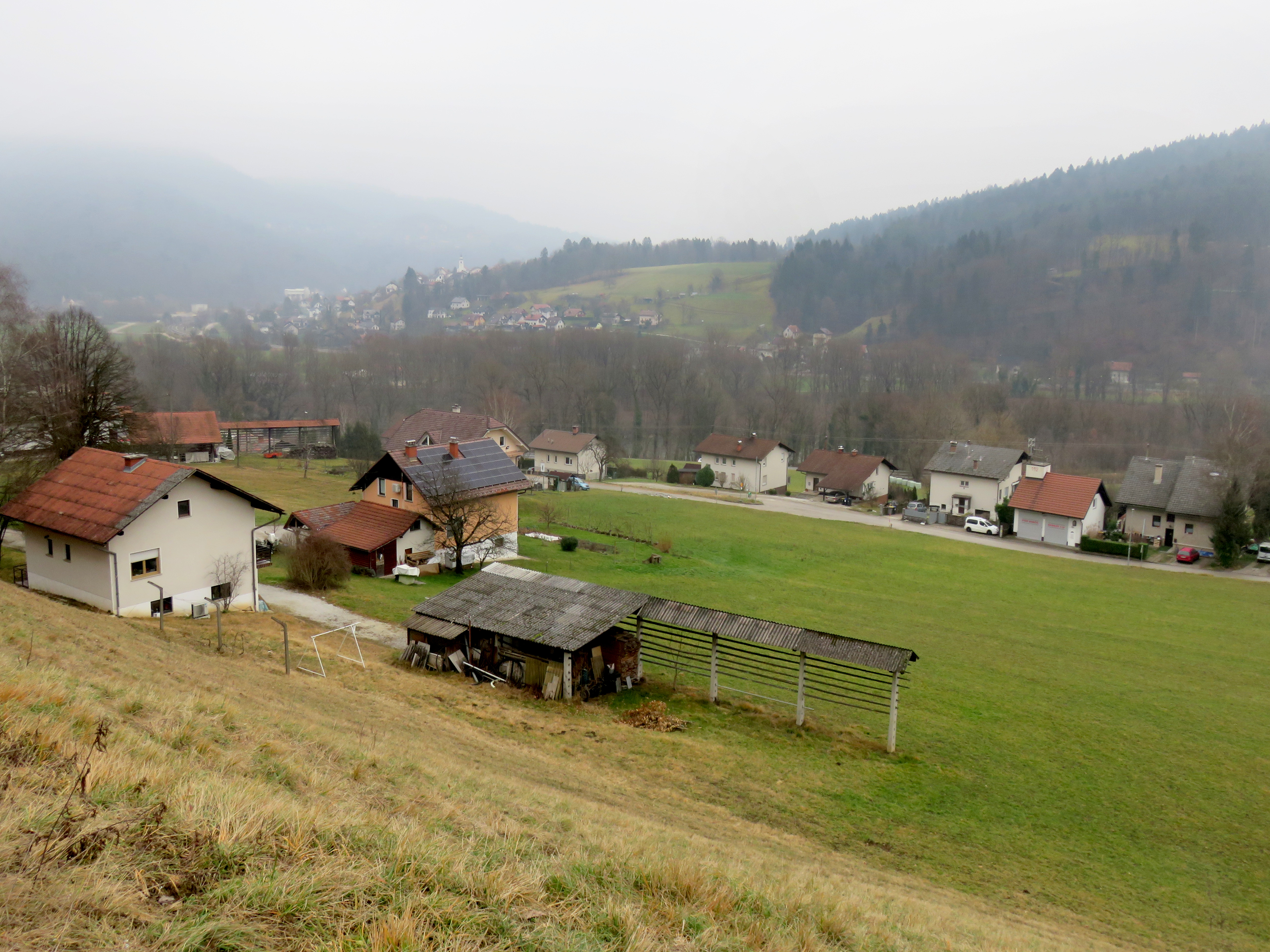

- Location in Slovenia
- Coordinates: 46°6′2″N 14°46′18″E
- Country: Slovenia
- Traditional region: Upper Carniola
- Statistical region: Central Sava
- Municipality: Litija
- Elevation: 260 m (850 ft)

Spodnje Ribče (pronounced [ˈspoːdnjɛ ˈɾiːptʃɛ], German: Unterfischern) is a former settlement in the Municipality of Litija in central Slovenia. It is now part of the village of Ribče. The area is part of the traditional region of Upper Carniola and is now included with the rest of the municipality in the Central Sava Statistical Region.

== Geography ==
Spodnje Ribče stands on the left bank of the Sava River, in the eastern part of the territory of Ribče, along the road from Litija to Dol pri Ljubljani. Janček Creek (Slovene: Jančkov graben), a tributary of the Sava, flows through the hamlet.

== Name ==
The name Spodnje Ribče means 'lower Ribče'. The settlement stands about 11 meters (36 ft) lower in elevation than neighboring Zgornje Ribče (literally, 'upper Ribče').

== History ==
Spodnje Ribče had a population of 55 living in 9 houses in 1900. Together with Dašnik and Zgornje Ribče, Spodnje Ribče was combined into a single settlement called Ribče in 1953, ending any existence it had as a separate settlement.
