= Zgornje Ribče =

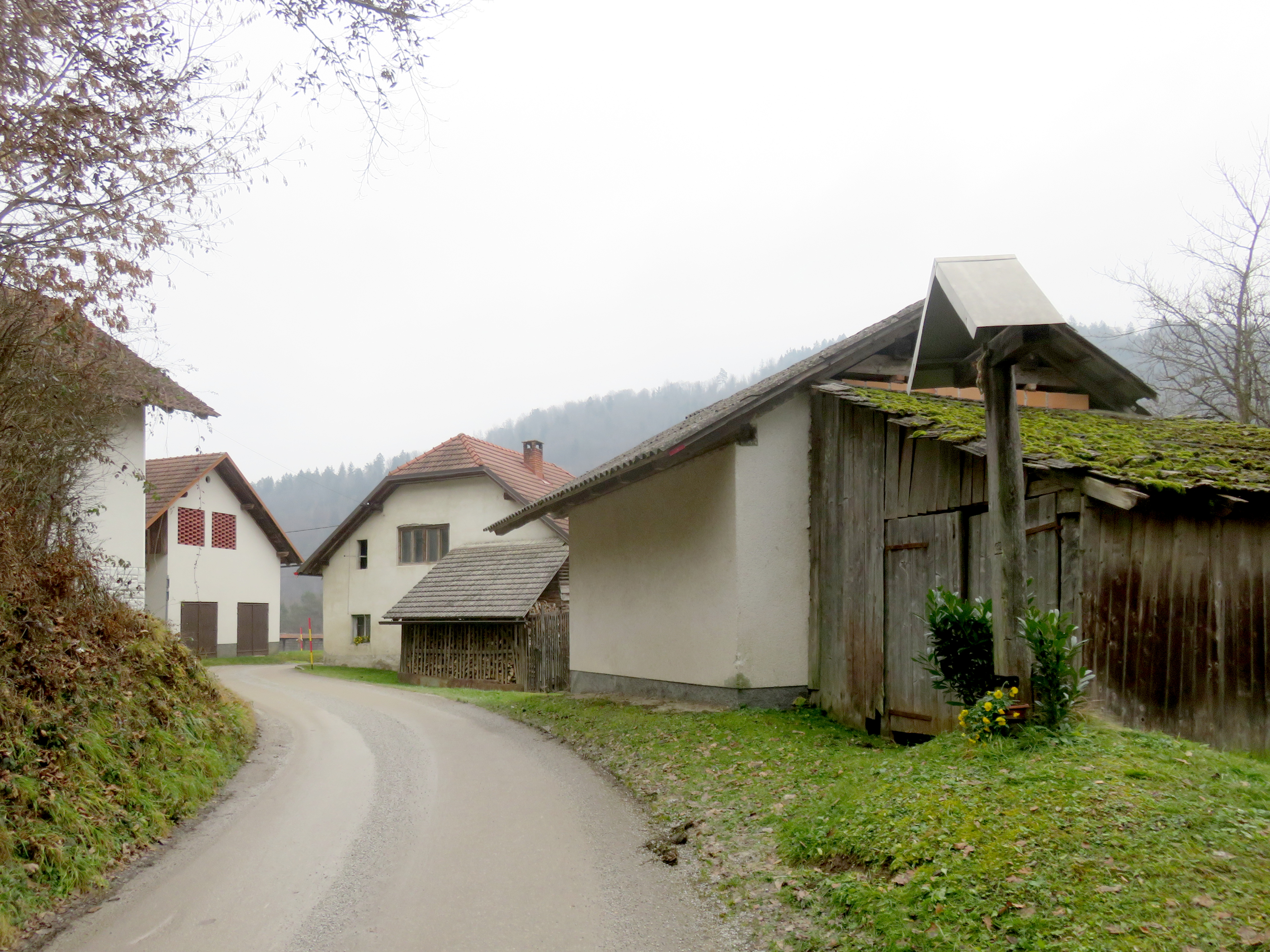

- Location in Slovenia
- Coordinates: 46°5′42″N 14°46′0″E
- Country: Slovenia
- Traditional region: Upper Carniola
- Statistical region: Central Sava
- Municipality: Litija
- Elevation: 271 m (889 ft)

Zgornje Ribče (pronounced [ˈzɡoːɾnjɛ ˈɾiːptʃɛ], German: Oberfischern) is a former settlement in the Municipality of Litija in central Slovenia. It is now part of the village of Ribče. The area is part of the traditional region of Upper Carniola and is now included with the rest of the municipality in the Central Sava Statistical Region.

== Geography ==
Zgornje Ribče stands on the left bank of the Sava River, in the western part of the territory of Ribče, along the road from Litija to Dol pri Ljubljani. Zalog Creek (Slovene: Zaloški potok), a tributary of the Sava, flows through the hamlet.

== Name ==
The name Zgornje Ribče means 'upper Ribče'. The settlement stands about 11 meters (36 ft) higher in elevation than neighboring Spodnje Ribče (literally, 'lower Ribče').

== History ==
Zgornje Ribče had a population of 100 living in 18 houses in 1900. Together with Dašnik and Spodnje Ribče, Zgornje Ribče was combined into a single settlement called Ribče in 1953, ending any existence it had as a separate settlement.
