= Hrib nad Ribčami =

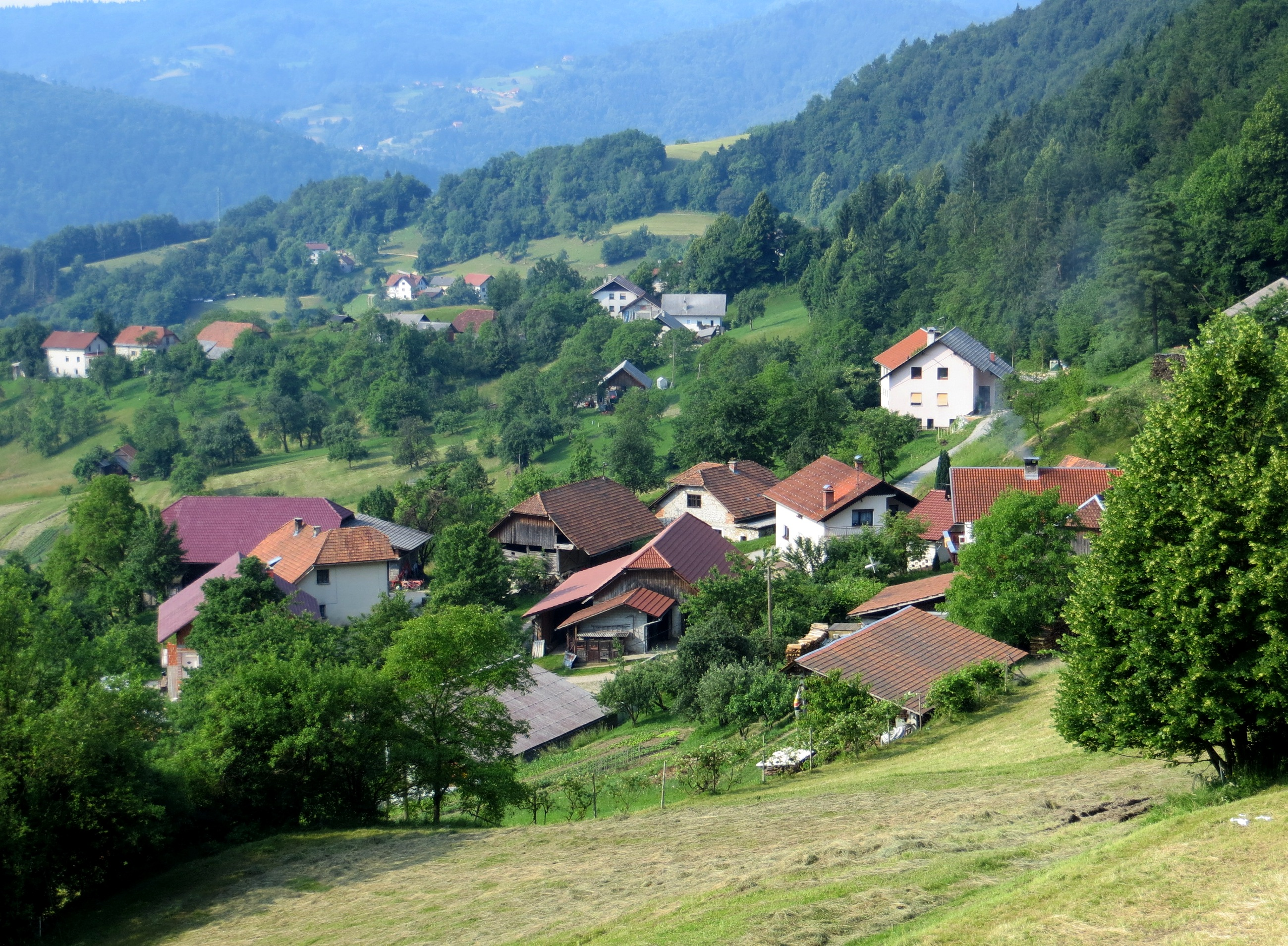

- Location in Slovenia
- Coordinates: 46°6′49.14″N 14°45′19.74″E
- Country: Slovenia
- Traditional region: Upper Carniola
- Statistical region: Central Slovenia
- Municipality: Moravče

Area
  - Total: 0.33 km^{2} (0.13 sq mi)
- Elevation: 479.2 m (1,572 ft)

Population (2002)
  - Total: 33
- Postal code: 1281

Hrib nad Ribčami (pronounced [ˈxɾiːp nat ˈɾiːptʃami]) is a settlement above Ribče in central Slovenia. It belongs to the Municipality of Moravče. The area is part of the traditional region of Upper Carniola. It is now included with the rest of the municipality in the Central Slovenia Statistical Region.

== Name ==
Hrib nad Ribčami was attested in historical sources as Puͤehel in 1418. The name of the settlement was changed from Hrib to Hrib nad Ribčami in 1955.

== History ==
Hrib nad Ribčami was made a separate village in 1953, when it was formed from the territory of Sveti Miklavž.
