= Zgornja Jevnica =

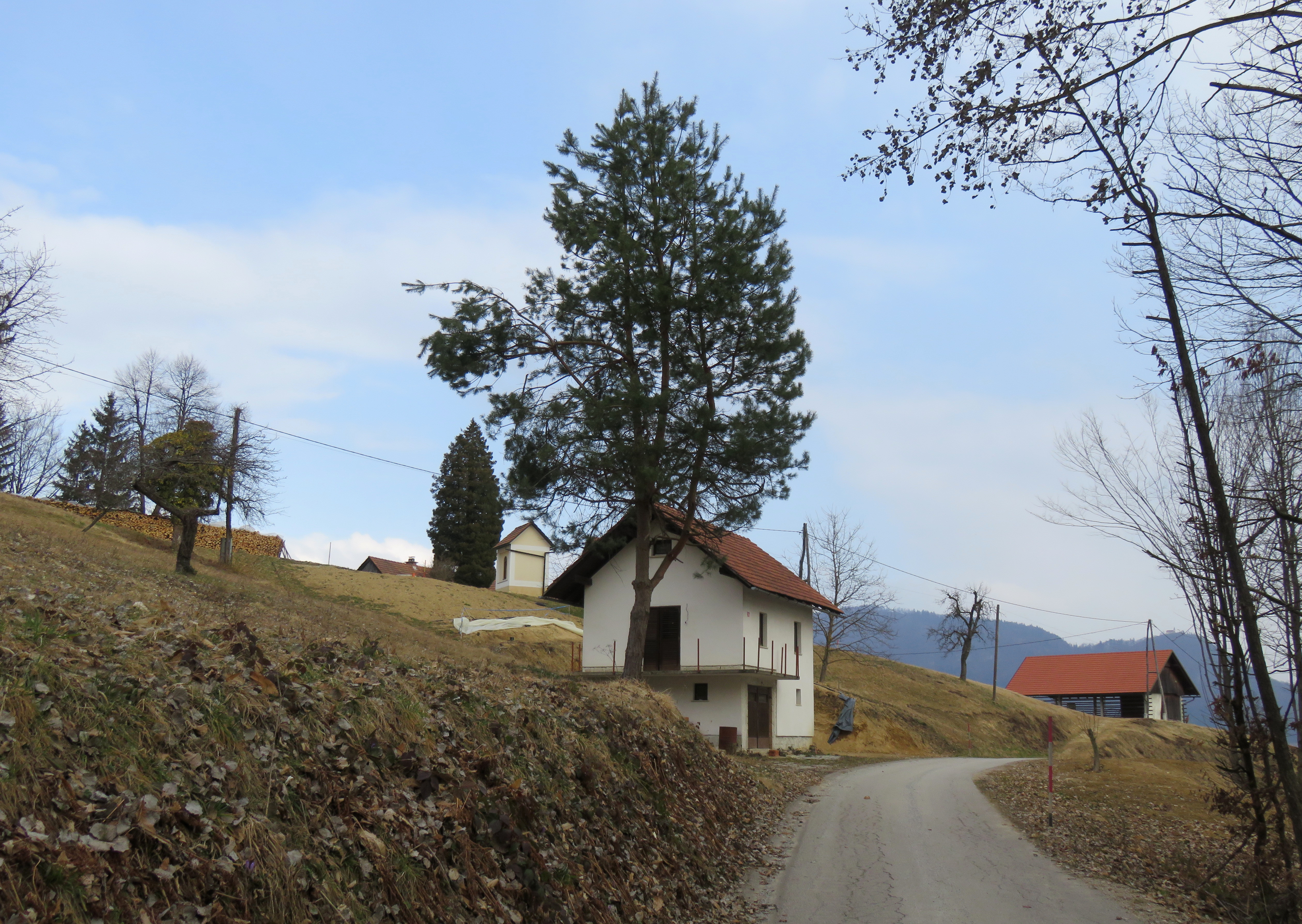

- Location in Slovenia
- Coordinates: 46°4′33.84″N 14°43′40.27″E
- Country: Slovenia
- Traditional region: Lower Carniola
- Statistical region: Central Sava
- Municipality: Litija

Area
  - Total: 2.96 km^{2} (1.14 sq mi)
- Elevation: 509.3 m (1,671 ft)

Population (2002)
  - Total: 55
- Postal code: 1281

Zgornja Jevnica (pronounced [ˈzɡoːɾnja ˈjeːu̯nitsa]) is a dispersed settlement in the hills above Jevnica in the Municipality of Litija in central Slovenia. The area is part of the traditional region of Lower Carniola and is now included with the rest of the municipality in the Central Sava Statistical Region. The settlement includes the hamlets of Mala Noga and Mala Dolga Noga.

== Name ==
The name Zgornja Jevnica means 'upper Jevnica'. The name Jevnica was first attested in written sources in 1449 as an der Gelnicz. The settlement is probably named after Jevnica Creek, a hydronym derived from the Slovene common noun jela 'fir', thus referring to the local vegetation.

== History ==
Zgornja Jevnica became an independent settlement in 1989, when it was administratively separated from Jevnica. Prior to this, Zgornja Jevnica was a hamlet of Jevnica.
