= Mala Dolga Noga =

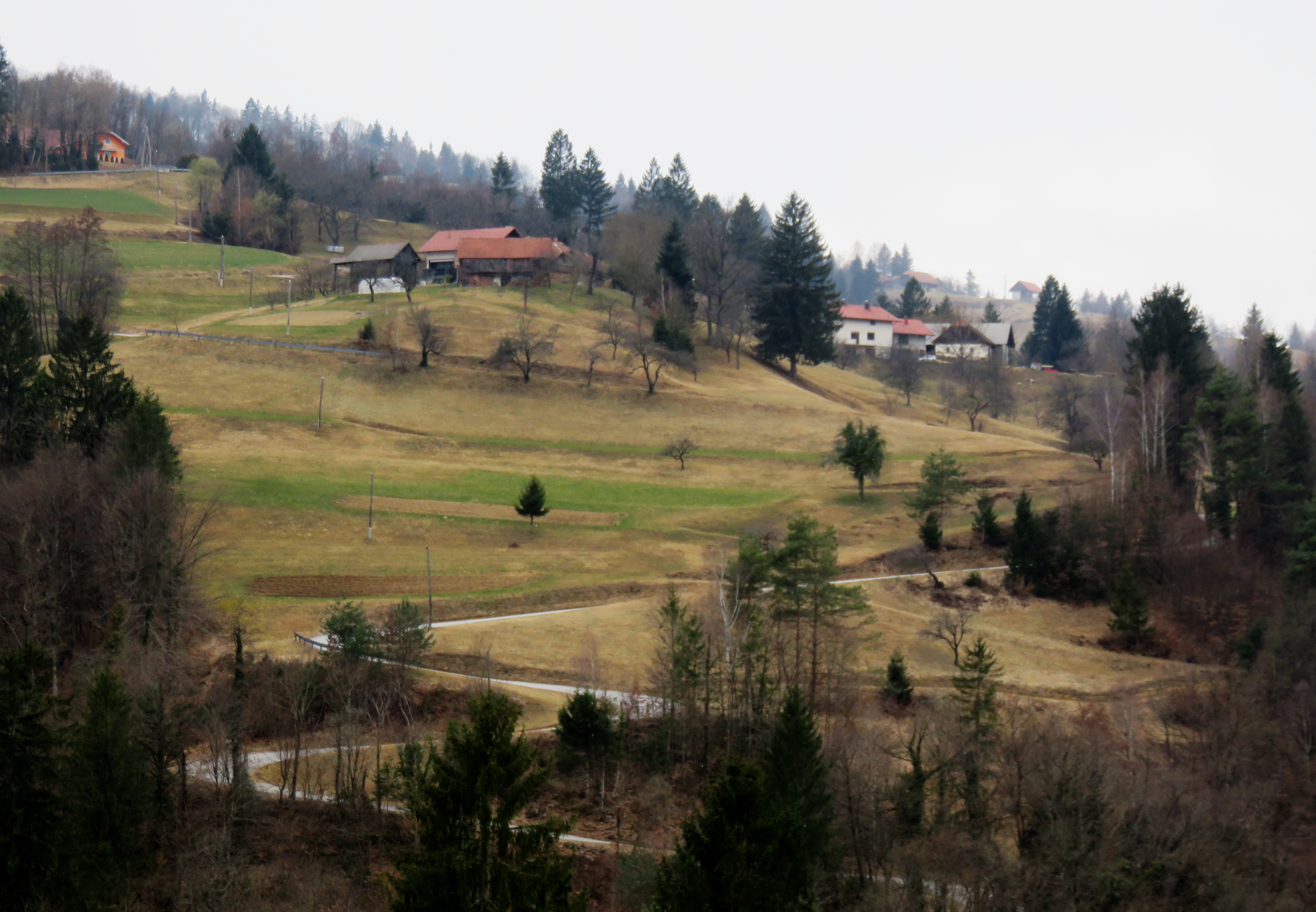

- Location in Slovenia
- Coordinates: 46°4′29″N 14°44′22″E
- Country: Slovenia
- Traditional region: Upper Carniola
- Statistical region: Central Sava
- Municipality: Litija
- Elevation: 498 m (1,634 ft)

Mala Dolga Noga (Slovene pronunciation: [ˈmaːla ˈdoːu̯ɡa ˈnoːɡa]) is a former settlement in the Municipality of Litija in central Slovenia. It is now part of the village of Zgornja Jevnica. The area is part of the traditional region of Upper Carniola and is now included with the rest of the municipality in the Central Sava Statistical Region.

== Geography ==
Mala Dolga Noga is located in the eastern part of Zgornja Jevnica, on a road climbing toward Bulantin Peak (Slovene: Bulantinov vrh, elevation: 645 meters or 2,116 feet) from the valley of Jevnica Creek.

== History ==
In figures encompassing all of what is now Zgornja Jevnica, Mala Dolga Noga had a population of 118 living in 14 houses in 1880, and 103 living in 15 houses in 1900. Mala Dolga Noga was annexed by Jevnica in 1953, ending its existence as a separate settlement. When Zgornja Jevnica became a separate settlement in 1989, Mala Dolga Noga was assigned to its territory.
