= Kresniške Poljane =

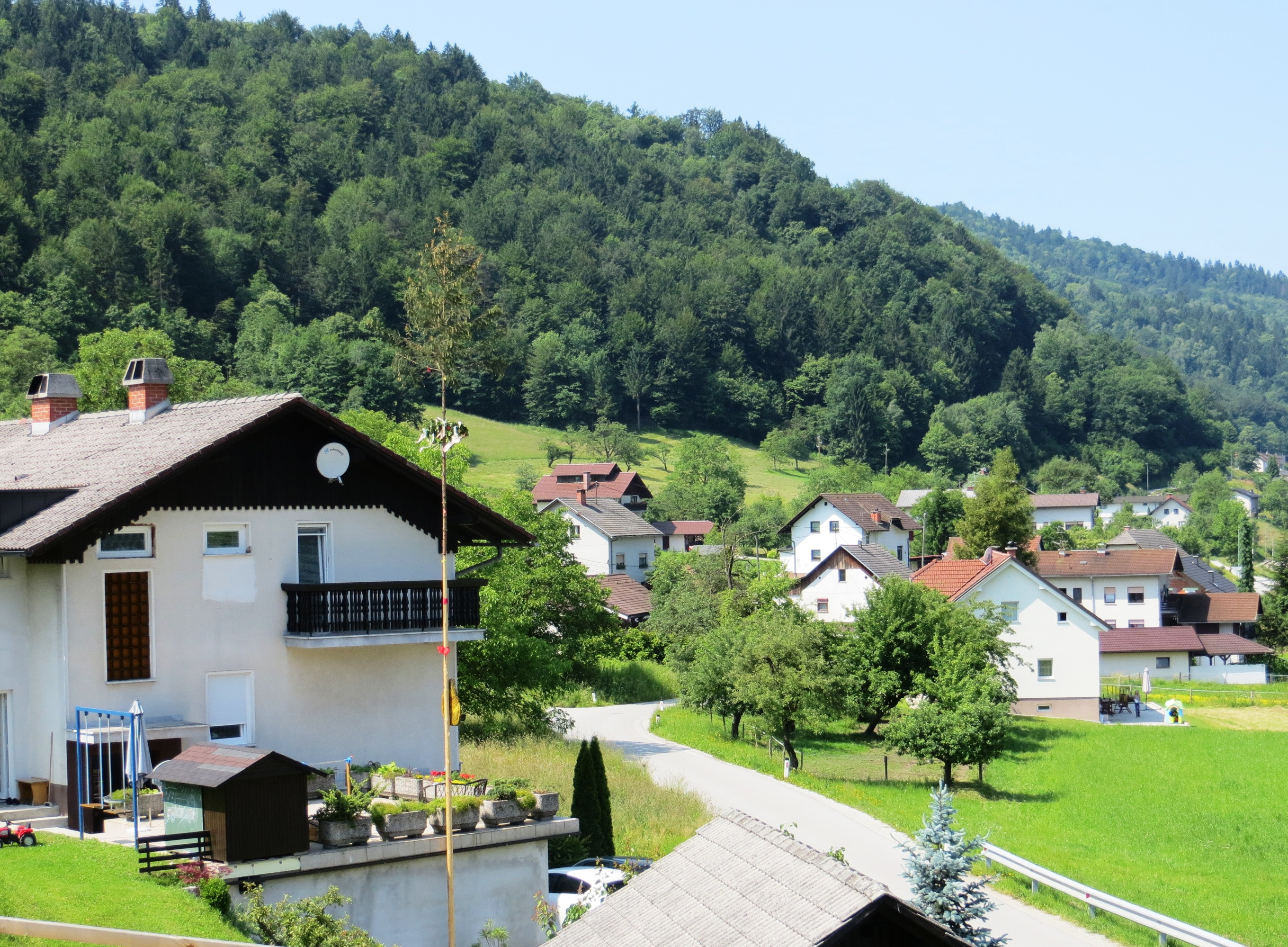

- Location in Slovenia
- Coordinates: 46°5′21.35″N 14°45′18.26″E
- Country: Slovenia
- Traditional region: Lower Carniola
- Statistical region: Central Sava
- Municipality: Litija

Area
  - Total: 2.75 km^{2} (1.06 sq mi)
- Elevation: 264.7 m (868 ft)

Population (2002)
  - Total: 318
- Postal code: 1281

Kresniške Poljane (pronounced [kɾɛˈsniːʃkɛ pɔˈljaːnɛ]; German: Kreßnitzpolane) is a settlement on the right bank of the Sava River in the Municipality of Litija in central Slovenia. It lies between Jevnica and Kresnice. The railway line from Ljubljana to Zidani Most runs through the settlement. The area is part of the traditional region of Lower Carniola. It is now included with the rest of the municipality in the Central Sava Statistical Region; until January 2014 the municipality was part of the Central Slovenia Statistical Region.

== Church ==
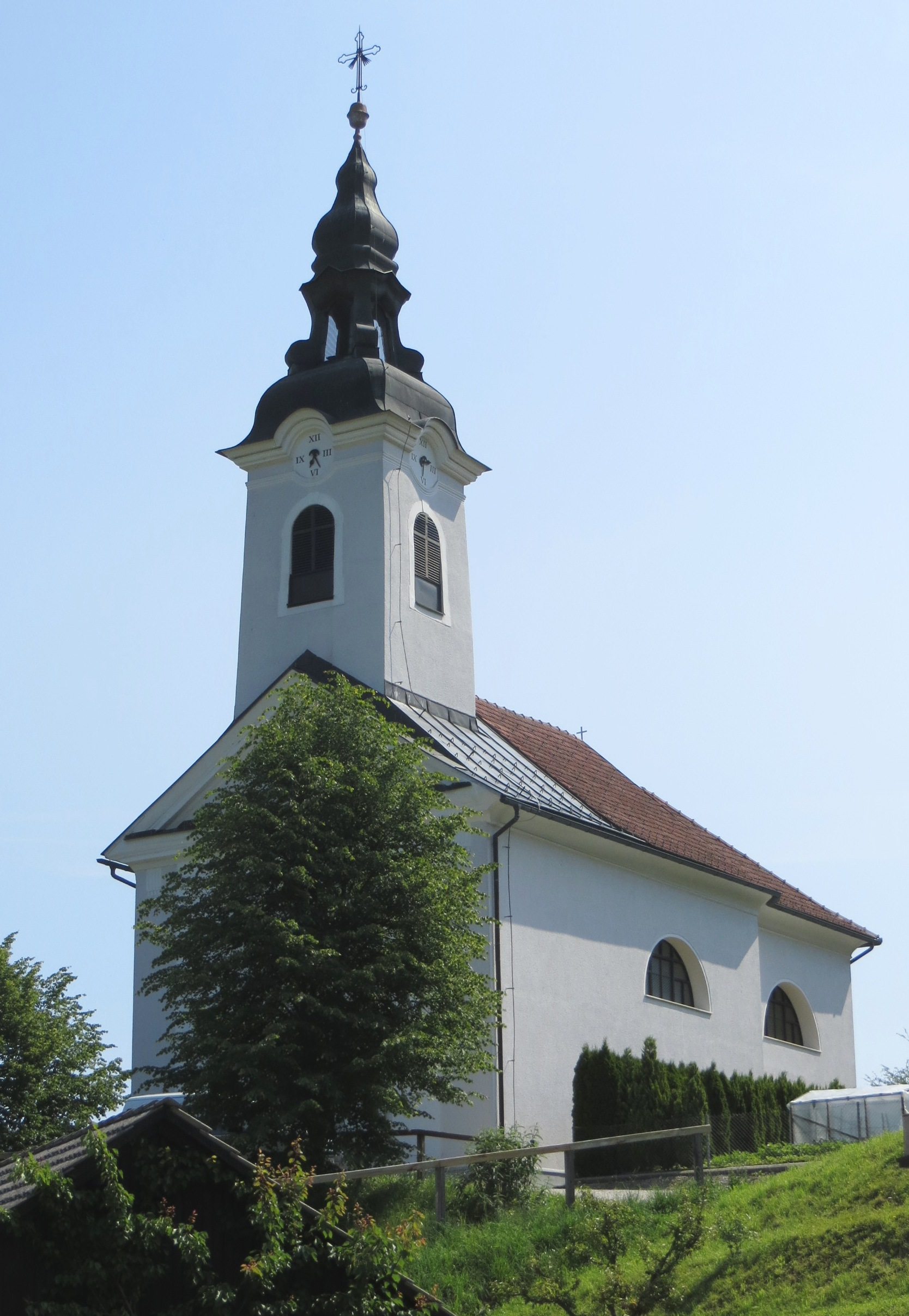
Our Lady of Sorrows Church

The local church is dedicated to Our Lady of Sorrows and belongs to the Parish of Kresnice. It was built in 1841 on the site of an earlier chapel.

== Gallery ==
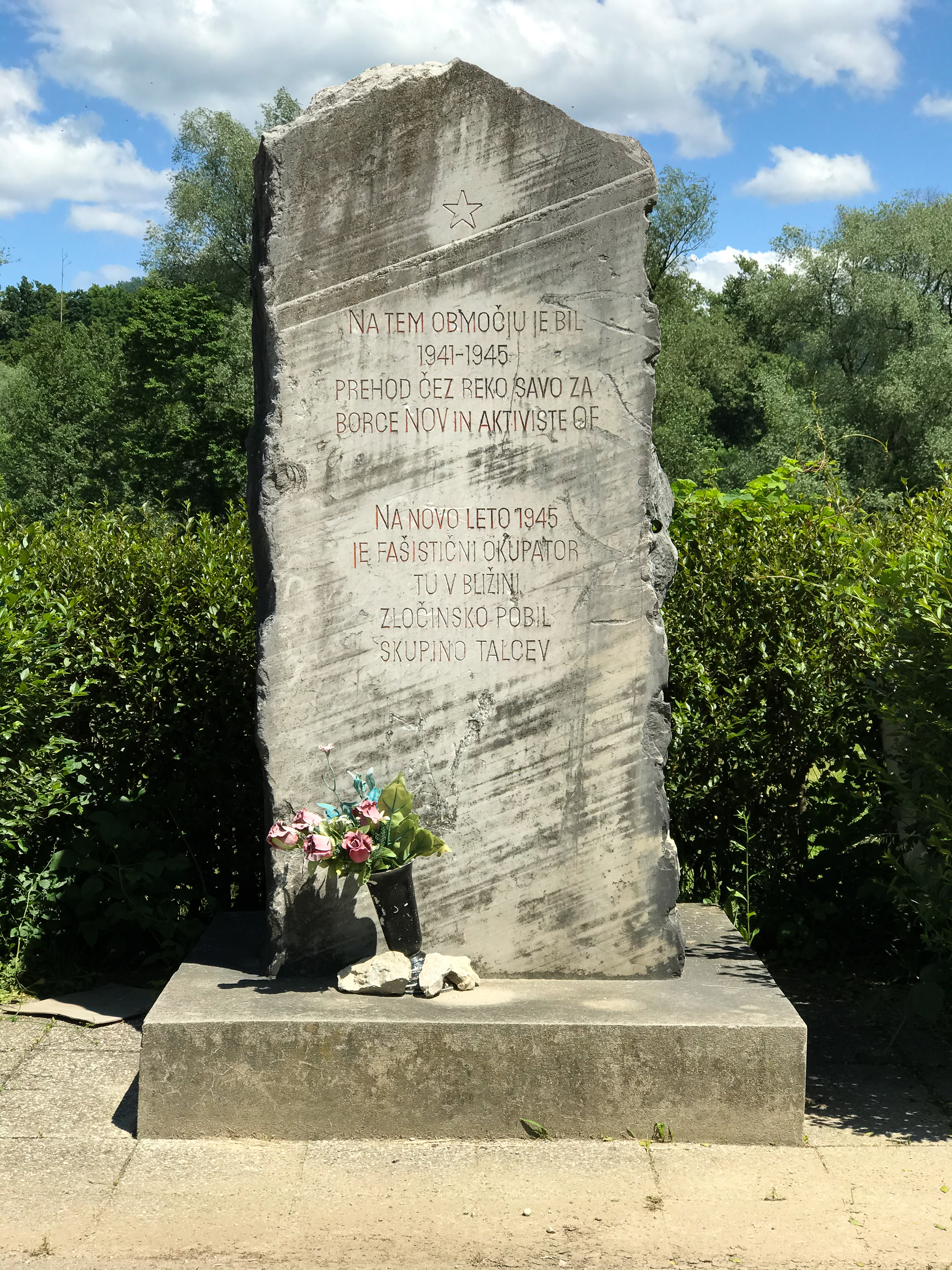
Partisan memorial in Kresniške Poljane
