= Zalog pri Kresnicah =

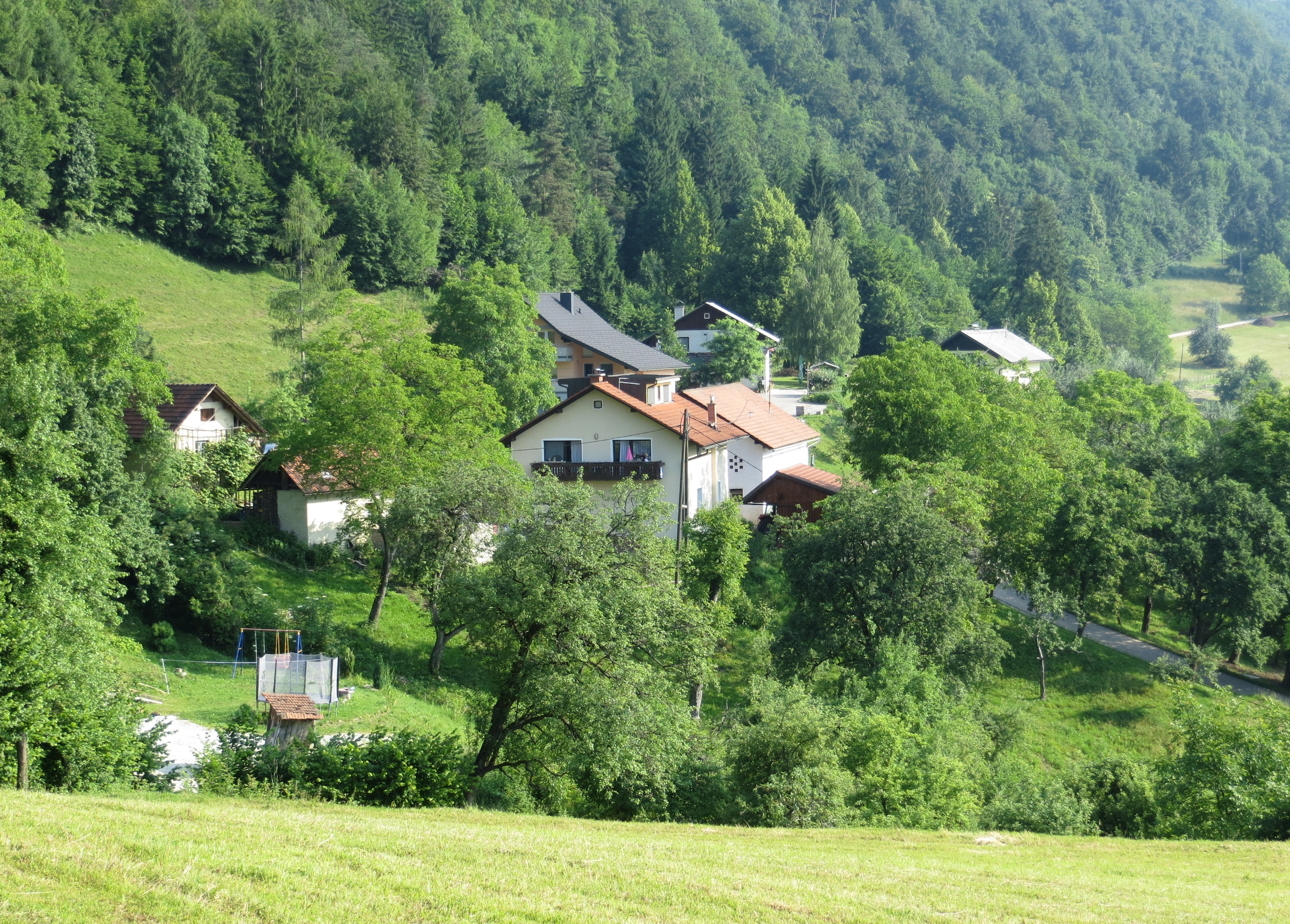

- Location in Slovenia
- Coordinates: 46°6′19.3″N 14°45′1.25″E
- Country: Slovenia
- Traditional region: Upper Carniola
- Statistical region: Central Slovenia
- Municipality: Moravče

Area
  - Total: 0.68 km^{2} (0.26 sq mi)
- Elevation: 435.7 m (1,429 ft)

Population (2002)
  - Total: 34
- Postal code: 1281

Zalog pri Kresnicah (pronounced [ˈzaːlɔk pɾi kɾɛˈsniːtsax]; German: Saloch) is a small settlement in the hills above the left bank of the Sava River in the Municipality of Moravče in central Slovenia. The area is part of the traditional region of Upper Carniola. It is now included with the rest of the municipality in the Central Slovenia Statistical Region.

== Name ==
Zalog pri Kresnicah was attested in historical sources as Zelog in 1370, Zalag in 1425, and Salog in 1505. The name Zalog pri Kresnicah means 'Zalog near Kresnice', differentiating the settlement from others named Zalog (e.g., Zalog pri Moravčah, Zalog pri Škofljici, etc.) The name Zalog is a fused prepositional phrase, derived from za 'behind' + log 'partially wooded (wet) meadow near water' or 'woods (near a settlement)'.

== History ==
Zalog pri Kresnicah was made a separate village in 1953, when it was formed from the territory of Sveti Miklavž.
