= Katarija =

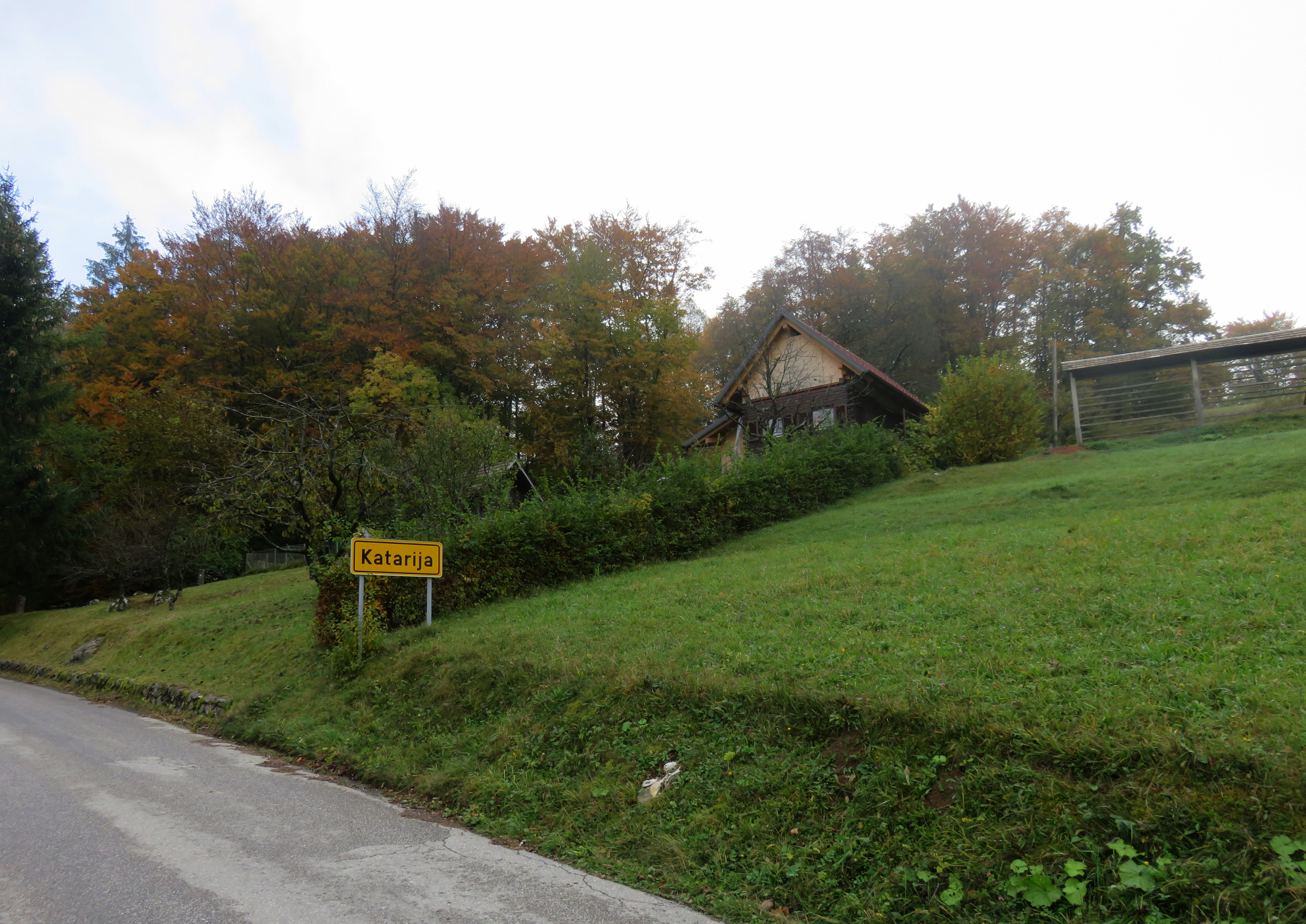

- Location in Slovenia
- Coordinates: 46°6′40.29″N 14°44′35.07″E
- Country: Slovenia
- Traditional region: Upper Carniola
- Statistical region: Central Slovenia
- Municipality: Moravče

Area
  - Total: 1.01 km^{2} (0.39 sq mi)
- Elevation: 701.9 m (2,303 ft)

Population (2002)
  - Total: 41
- Postal code: 1251

Katarija (pronounced [kataˈɾiːja]) is a settlement in the hills south of Moravče in central Slovenia. The area is part of the traditional region of Upper Carniola. It is now included with the rest of the Municipality of Moravče in the Central Slovenia Statistical Region. In addition to the main settlement, it includes the hamlets of Vrh Svetega Miklavža and Grmače.

== History ==
During the Second World War, there was a Partisan checkpoint at the Lazar house in the village; other Partisan activities included a bunker established in August 1942 for treating the wounded. On 13 August 1944 German forces burned the main settlement and the hamlet of Grmače, as well as two houses in Vrh Svetega Miklavža. A Partisan monument was unveiled in Grmače in 1953.

Katarija was made a separate village in 1953, when it was formed from the territory of Sveti Miklavž, where Saint Nicholas' Church is located.

== Other cultural heritage ==
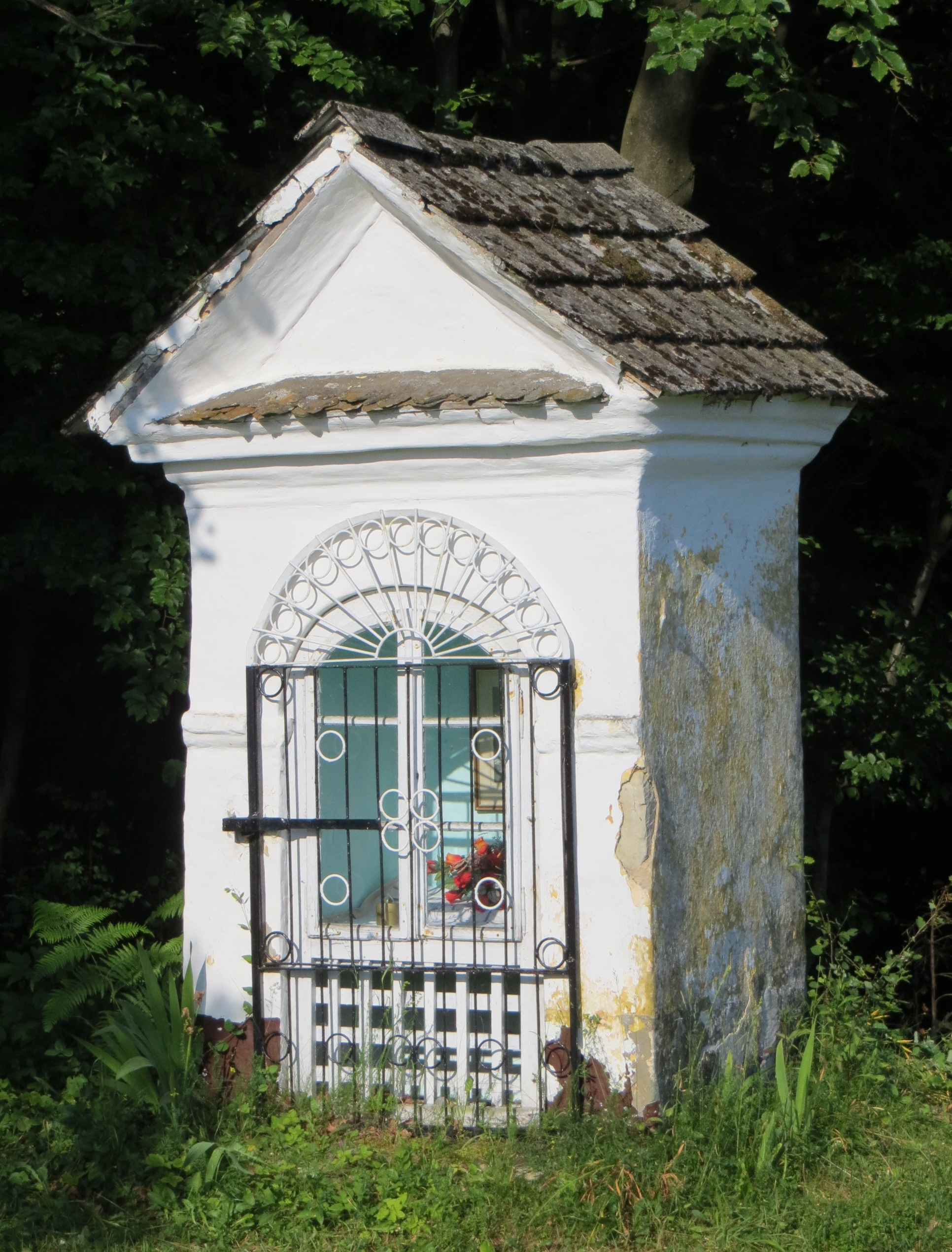
Our Lady of Sorrows chapel-shrine

In addition to Saint Nicholas' Church and other cultural heritage sites in Sveti Miklavž and Grmače, Katarija has a chapel-shrine dedicated to Our Lady of Sorrows on the edge of the woods along the former route to Saint Nicholas' Church. It is a closed masonry shrine with a gabled roof covered with concrete tiles and dates from the second half of the 19th century. It formerly contained a wooden folk statue of Our Lady of Sorrows; today it contains a painting of the Pietà.
