= Grmače =

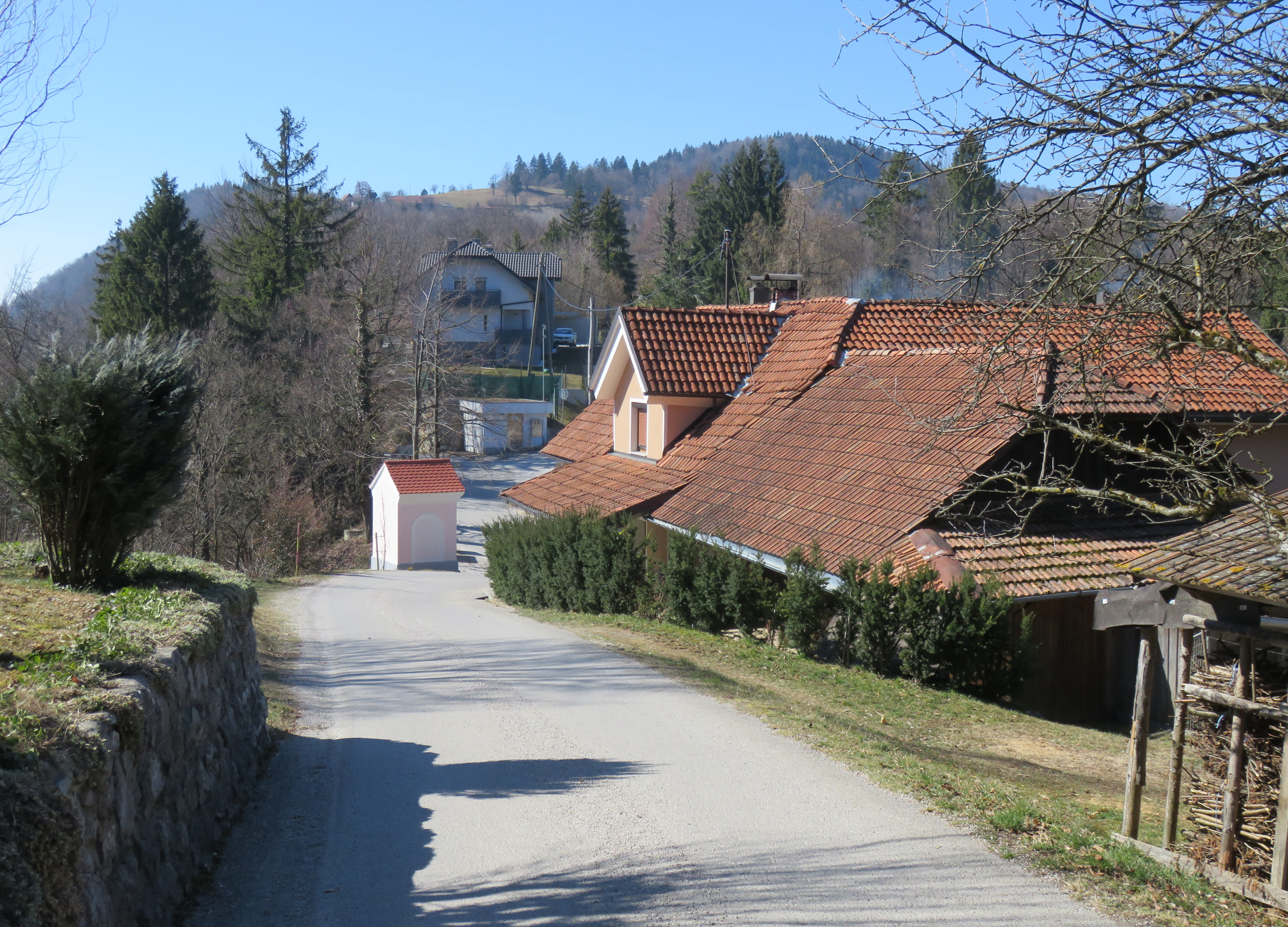

- Location in Slovenia
- Coordinates: 46°7′02″N 14°45′26″E
- Country: Slovenia
- Traditional region: Upper Carniola
- Statistical region: Central Slovenia
- Municipality: Moravče
- Elevation: 580 m (1,900 ft)

Grmače (Slovene pronunciation: [ɡəɾˈmaːtʃɛ], in older sources also Grmača and Germače) is a former settlement in the Municipality of Moravče in central Slovenia. It is now part of the village of Katarija. The area is part of the traditional region of Upper Carniola. The municipality is now included in the Central Slovenia Statistical Region.

== Geography ==
Grmače lies in the extreme northeast of the village of Katarija, at the top of the Grmače Pass, which connects the Sava Valley with the Moravče Valley.

== History ==
Grmače is among the comparatively more recent settlements in the area. Grmače was initially annexed by Češnjice pri Moravčah in 1952, ending its existence as an independent settlement. It was later assigned to Katarija.

== Cultural heritage ==
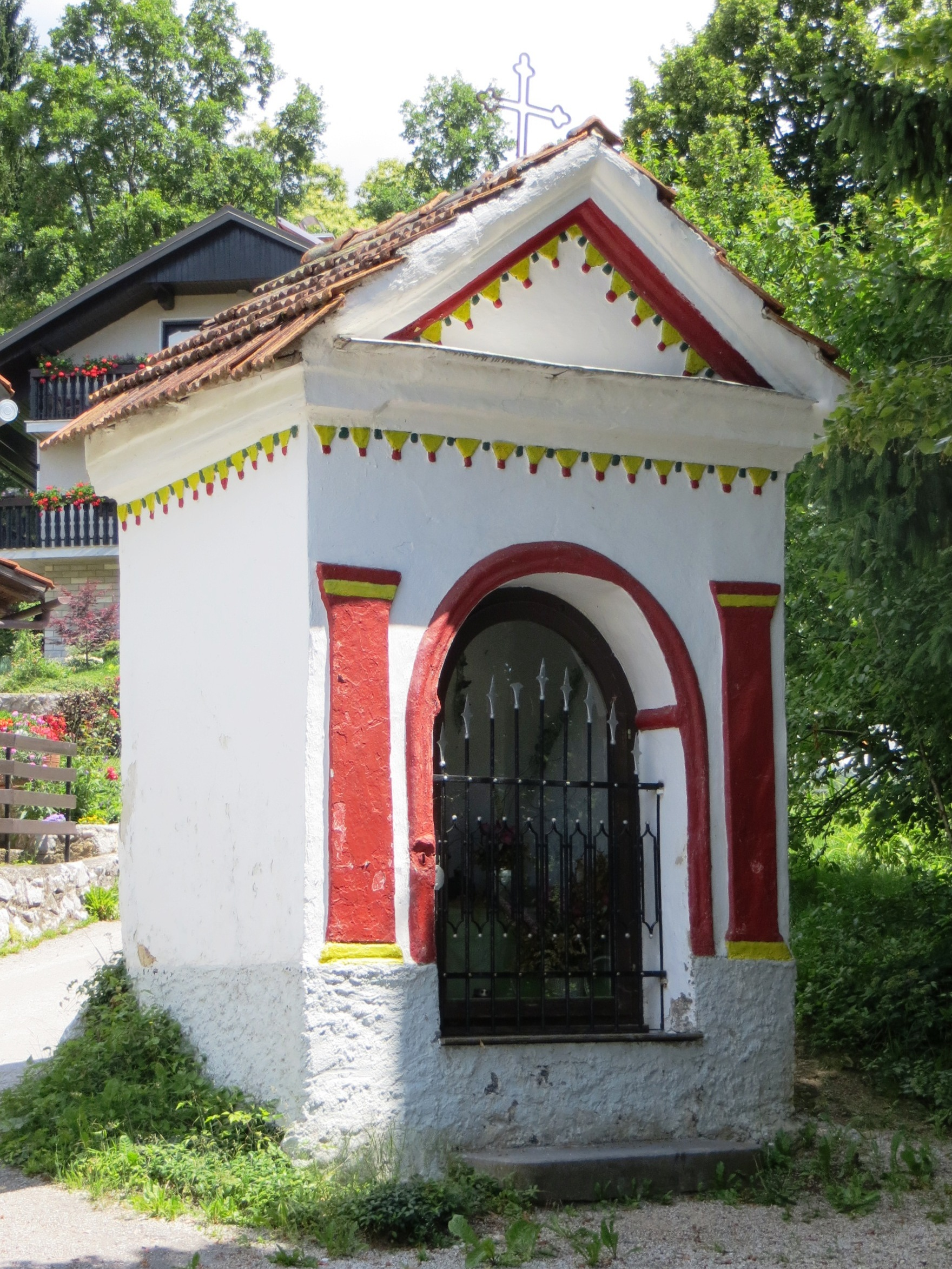
Grmače chapel-shrine

- The Grmače chapel-shrine is a closed structure with a tiled roof topped by a cast-iron cross. The niche contains a statue of Our Lady, Star of the Sea (Slovene: Marija zvezde). The front of the shrine features a profiled cornice, decorative tassels, and pilasters. It dates from the first half of the 19th century and stands at the Grmače Pass.
- There is a Partisan monument in Grmače that commemorates Partisan soldiers that fell during the Second World War and other victims of the Axis forces. It was erected in 1953.
