= Spodnji Prekar =

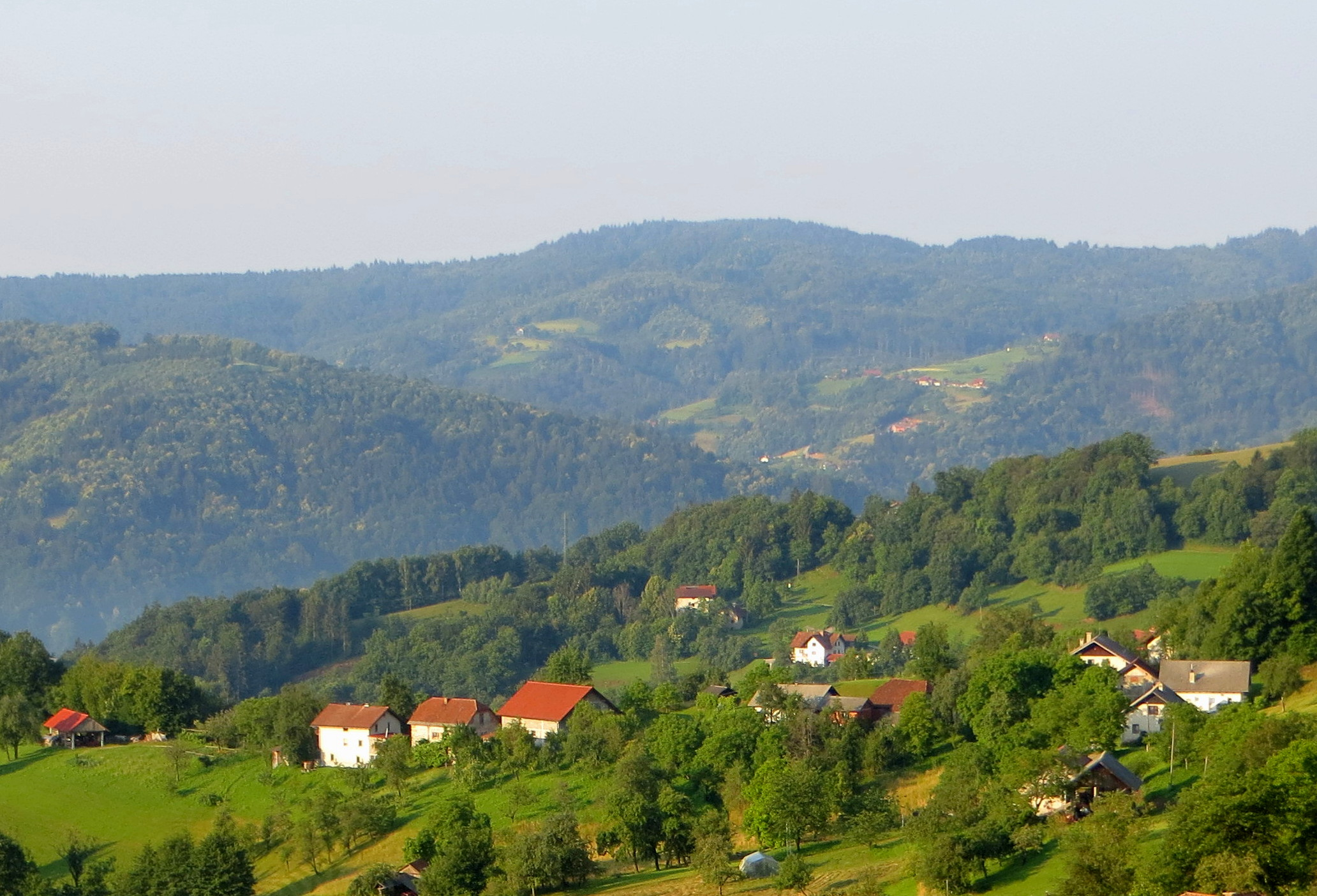

- Location in Slovenia
- Coordinates: 46°6′35.52″N 14°45′14.21″E
- Country: Slovenia
- Traditional region: Upper Carniola
- Statistical region: Central Slovenia
- Municipality: Moravče

Area
  - Total: 0.68 km^{2} (0.26 sq mi)
- Elevation: 457.9 m (1,502 ft)

Population (2002)
  - Total: 42
- Postal code: 1281

Spodnji Prekar (pronounced [ˈspoːdnji ˈpɾeːkaɾ]; German: Unterprekar) is a small settlement in the hills above the left bank of the Sava River in the Municipality of Moravče in central Slovenia. The area is part of the traditional region of Upper Carniola. It is now included with the rest of the municipality in the Central Slovenia Statistical Region.

== Name ==
Spodnji Prekar was attested in historical sources as Precor in 1350, Prak in 1422, and Preckher in 1453, among other spellings.

== History ==
Spodnji Prekar was already considered a separate village in the 19th century. Following administrative changes, Spodnji Prekar was again made a separate village in 1953, when it was formed from the territory of Sveti Miklavž.
