= Sveti Miklavž, Moravče =

Sveti Miklavž
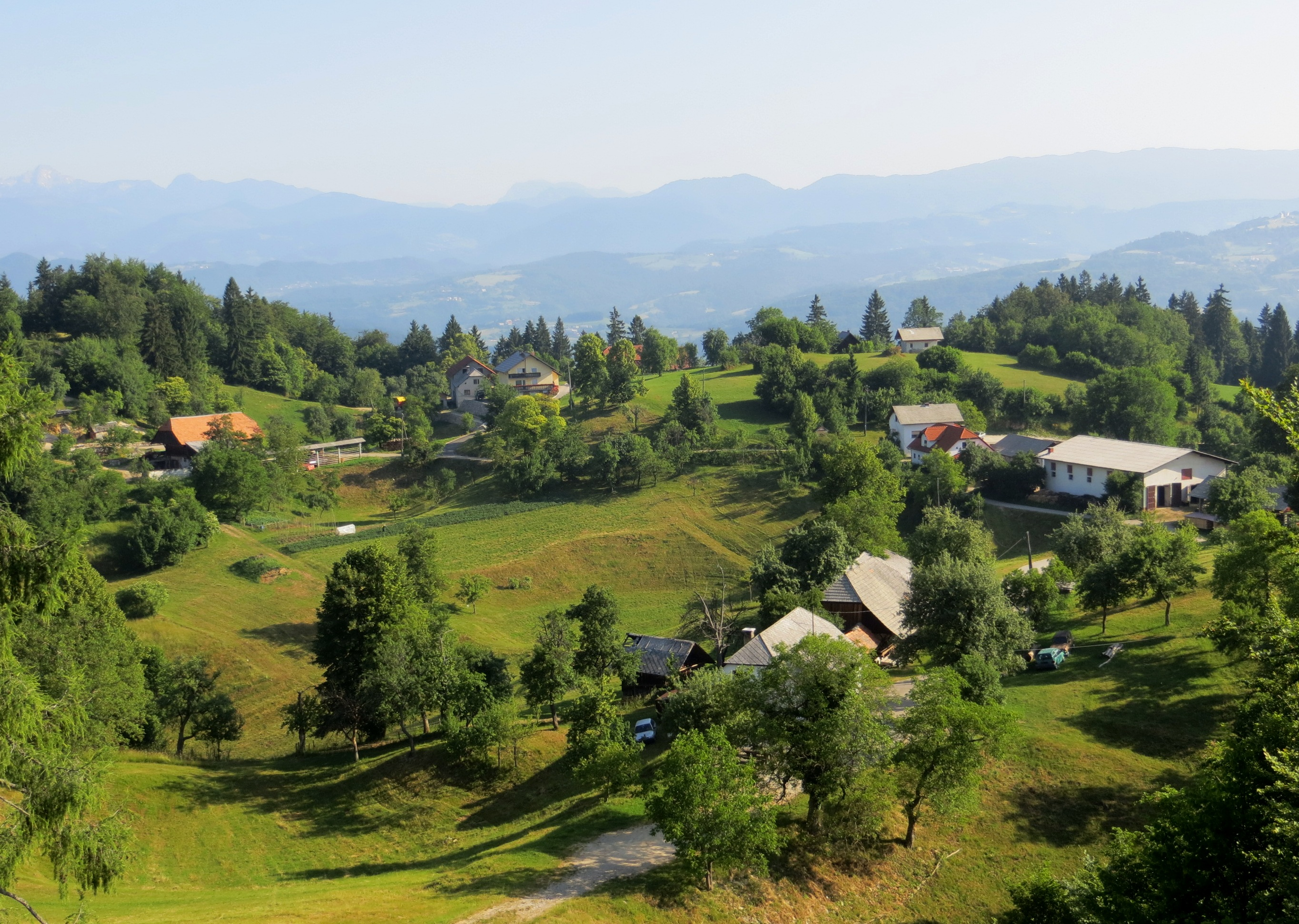

- Location in Slovenia
- Coordinates: 46°6′37″N 14°44′39″E
- Country: Slovenia
- Traditional region: Upper Carniola
- Statistical region: Central Slovenia
- Municipality: Moravče
- Elevation: 700 m (2,300 ft)

Sveti Miklavž (Slovene pronunciation: [ˈsʋeːti miˈklaːu̯ʃ], sometimes Vrh svetega Miklavža or simply Vrh, German: Werch) is a former settlement in the Municipality of Moravče in central Slovenia. It is now part of the villages of Hrib nad Ribčami, Katarija, Spodnji Prekar, Velika Vas, Zalog pri Kresnicah, and Zgornji Prekar. The area is part of the traditional region of Upper Carniola. The municipality is now included in the Central Slovenia Statistical Region.

== Geography ==
The old village core of Sveti Miklavž lies in the extreme south of the village of Katarija, on the Cicelj Ridge, which separates the Sava Valley from the Moravče Valley.

== History ==
The core settlement of Sveti Miklavž had a population of 34 living in four houses in 1880, and 25 living in four houses in 1900. The territory of Sveti Miklavž was split between what are now six villages (Hrib nad Ribčami, Katarija, Spodnji Prekar, Velika Vas, Zalog pri Kresnicah, and Zgornji Prekar) in 1953, ending its existence as an independent settlement.

== Church ==
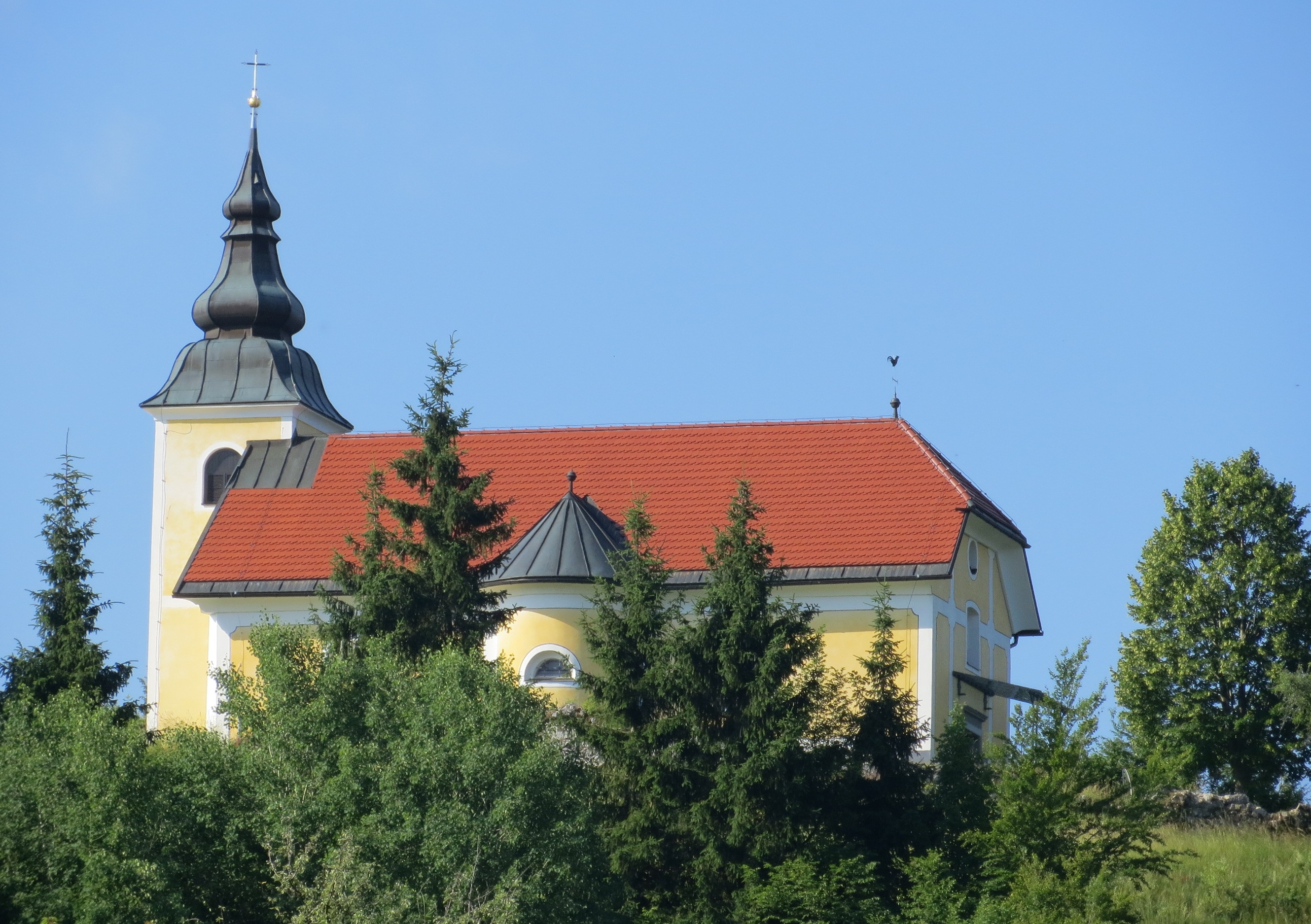
Saint Nicholas' Church

The local church is dedicated to Saint Nicholas and belongs to the Parish of Moravče. It dates to the mid-15th century. Saint Nicholas was the patron of boatmen on the Sava River. The church was referred to as the "Guardian of the Upper Sava" (Slovene: čuvar zgornje Save) because the boatmen believed that they were protected as long as they had the church in their sight. The church is vaulted, with a rectangular nave and a shallow chancel. Tradition states that the church was built to replace an older church that stood in Velika Vas but was burned by Ottoman forces. A less accessible location was selected for the new church, at a site where a pagan temple formerly stood. The remains of a fortified wall surround the church, and the building has frescoes dating from the 15th and 16th centuries that have been whitewashed over. The main altar features a painting by Franz Götzl and the side altars have Baroque paintings.

== Other cultural heritage ==
In addition to Saint Nicholas' Church, two other sites in Sveti Miklavž are registered as cultural heritage:

- The Vrh Svetega Miklavža archaeological site contains traces of prehistoric and late Roman-era settlement, as well as a medieval fortified wall.
- The Mežnar chapel-shrine stands along the road below Saint Nicholas' church. It is a square, closed masonry shrine with a gabled roof. Its semicircular niche contains a statue of the Virgin Mary, and the sides feature paintings of Saint Nicholas and Saint Martin. It dates from the mid-19th century.
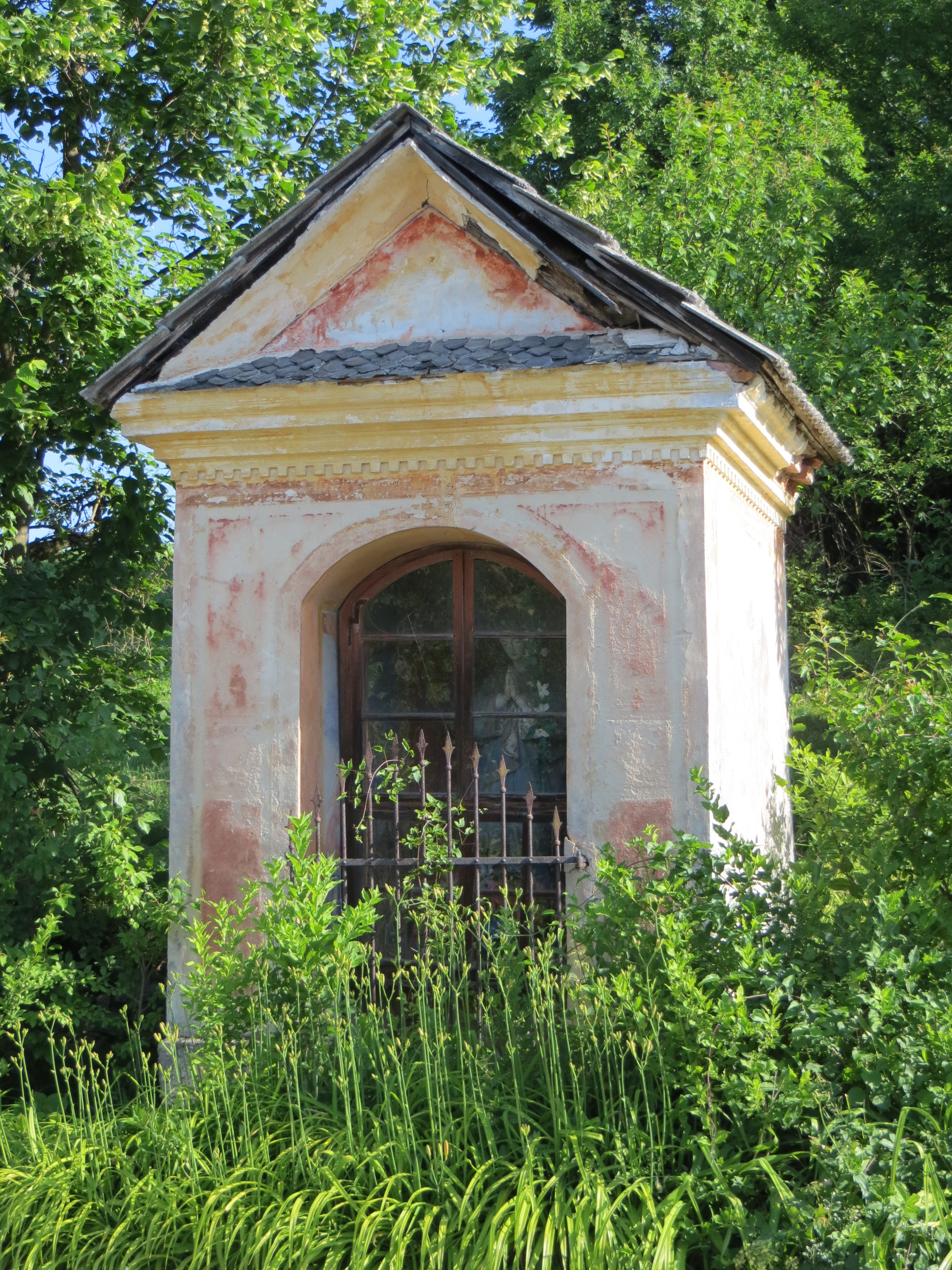
Mežnar chapel-shrine
