= Velika Vas, Moravče =

Velika Vas
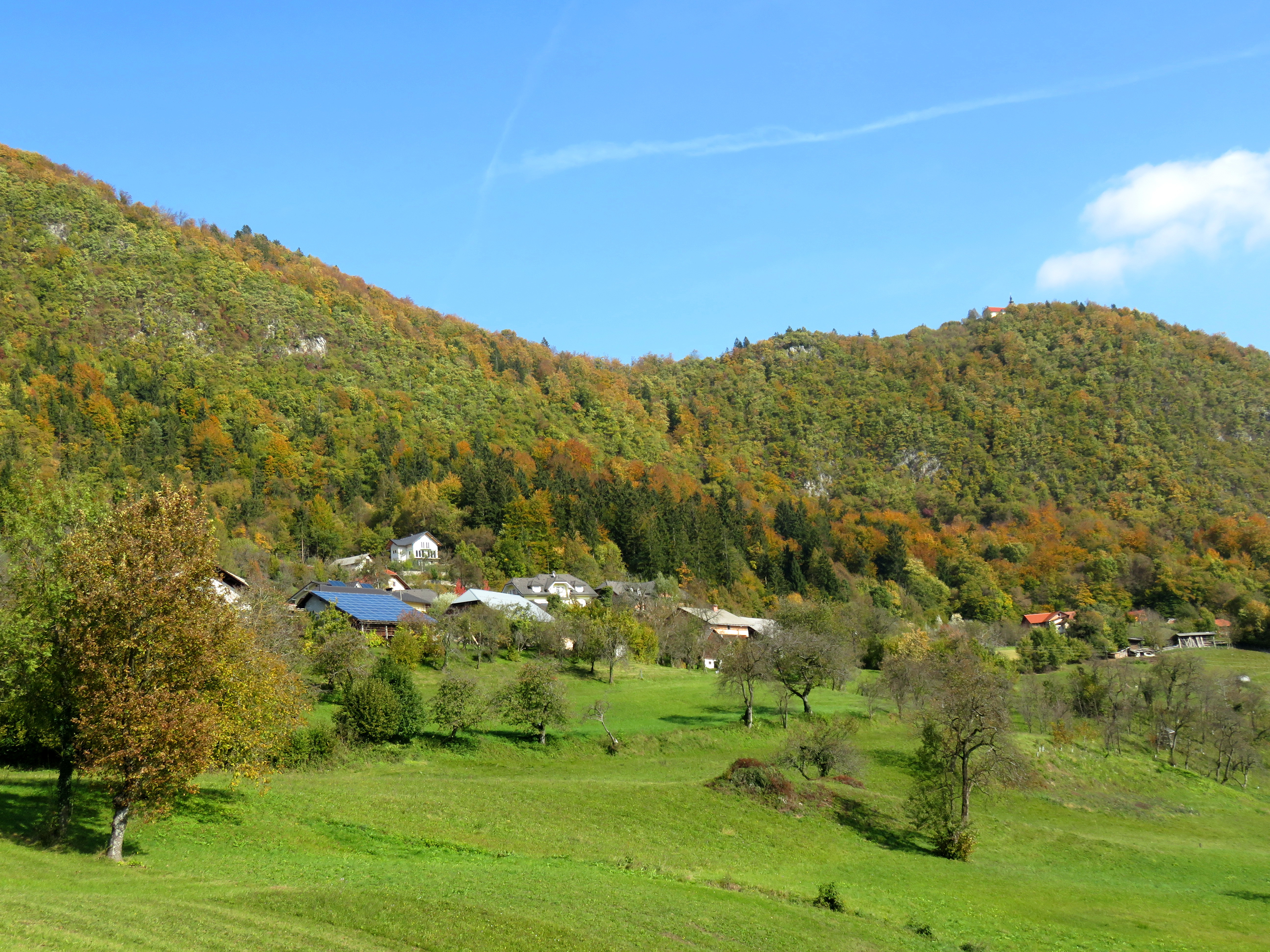

- Location in Slovenia
- Coordinates: 46°6′18.2″N 14°44′6.77″E
- Country: Slovenia
- Traditional region: Upper Carniola
- Statistical region: Central Slovenia
- Municipality: Moravče

Area
  - Total: 2.62 km^{2} (1.01 sq mi)
- Elevation: 510.1 m (1,674 ft)

Population (2002)
  - Total: 53
- Postal code: 1251

Velika Vas (pronounced [ˈʋeːlika ˈʋaːs]; Slovene: Velika vas, German: Großdorf) is a settlement in the hills above the left bank of the Sava River in the Municipality of Moravče in central Slovenia. The area is part of the traditional region of Upper Carniola. It is now included with the rest of the municipality in the Central Slovenia Statistical Region.

== Name ==
The name Velika vas literally means 'big village'. Velika Vas was attested in historical sources as Michilndorff in 1178, Michildorf in 1344, and Mycheldorf (cf. Middle High German michel 'big', dorf 'village') in 1384, among other spellings.

== History ==
Velika Vas was already considered a separate village in the 19th century. Following administrative changes, Velika Vas was again made a separate village in 1953, when it was formed from the territory of Sveti Miklavž.
