= Zgornji Prekar =

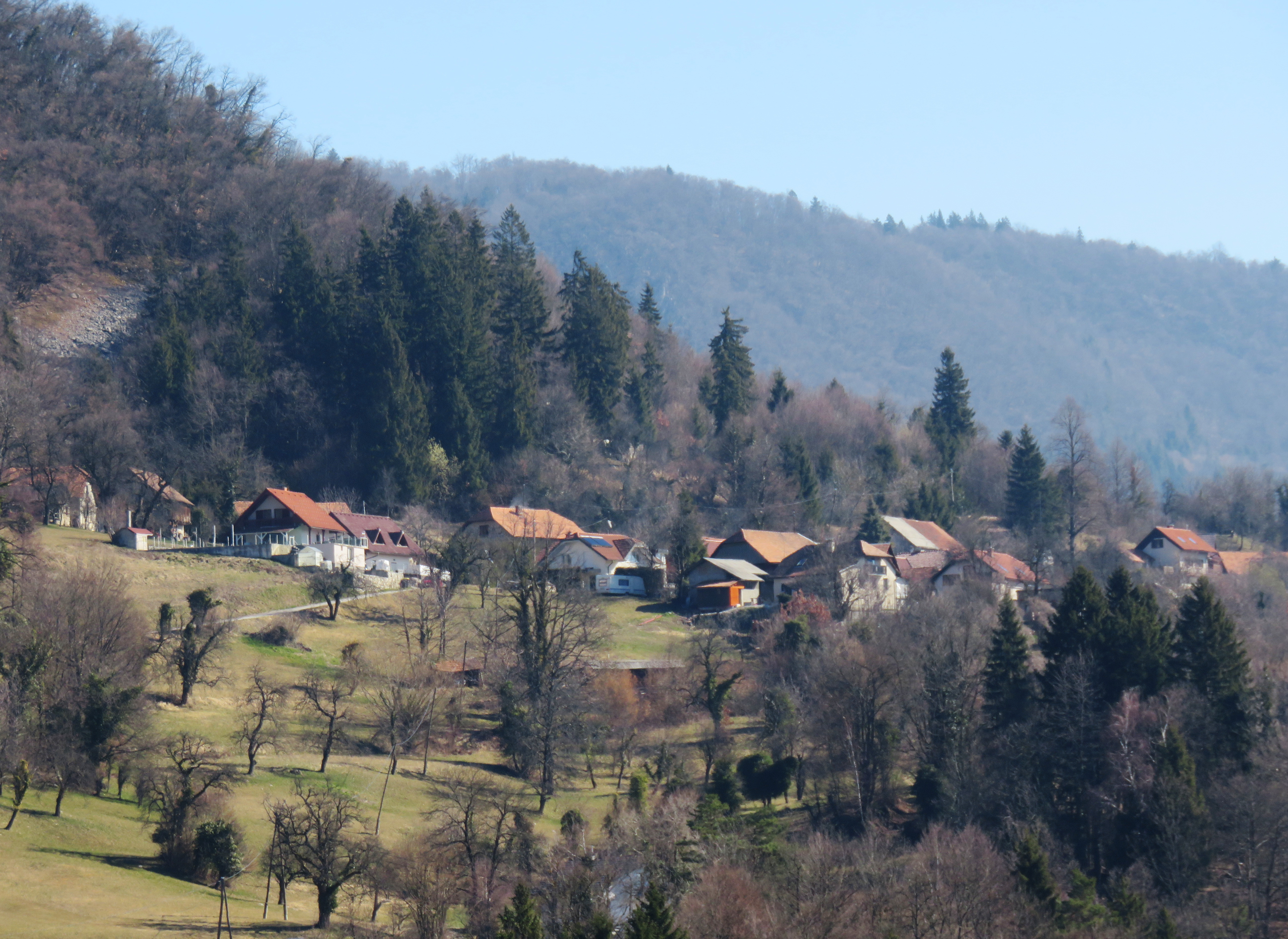

- Location in Slovenia
- Coordinates: 46°6′52.46″N 14°45′58.85″E
- Country: Slovenia
- Traditional region: Upper Carniola
- Statistical region: Central Slovenia
- Municipality: Moravče

Area
  - Total: 1.38 km^{2} (0.53 sq mi)
- Elevation: 543.6 m (1,783 ft)

Population (2002)
  - Total: 43
- Postal code: 1251

Zgornji Prekar (pronounced [ˈzɡoːɾnji ˈpɾeːkaɾ]; German: Oberprekar) is a settlement in the hills above the left bank of the Sava River in the Municipality of Moravče in central Slovenia. The area is part of the traditional region of Upper Carniola. It is now included with the rest of the municipality in the Central Slovenia Statistical Region.

== Name ==
Zgornji Prekar was attested in historical sources as Precor in 1350, Prak in 1422, and Preckher in 1453, among other spellings.

== History ==
Zgornji Prekar was already considered a separate village in the 19th century. Following administrative changes, Zgornji Prekar was again made a separate village in 1953, when it was formed from the territory of Sveti Miklavž.
