= Ribče =

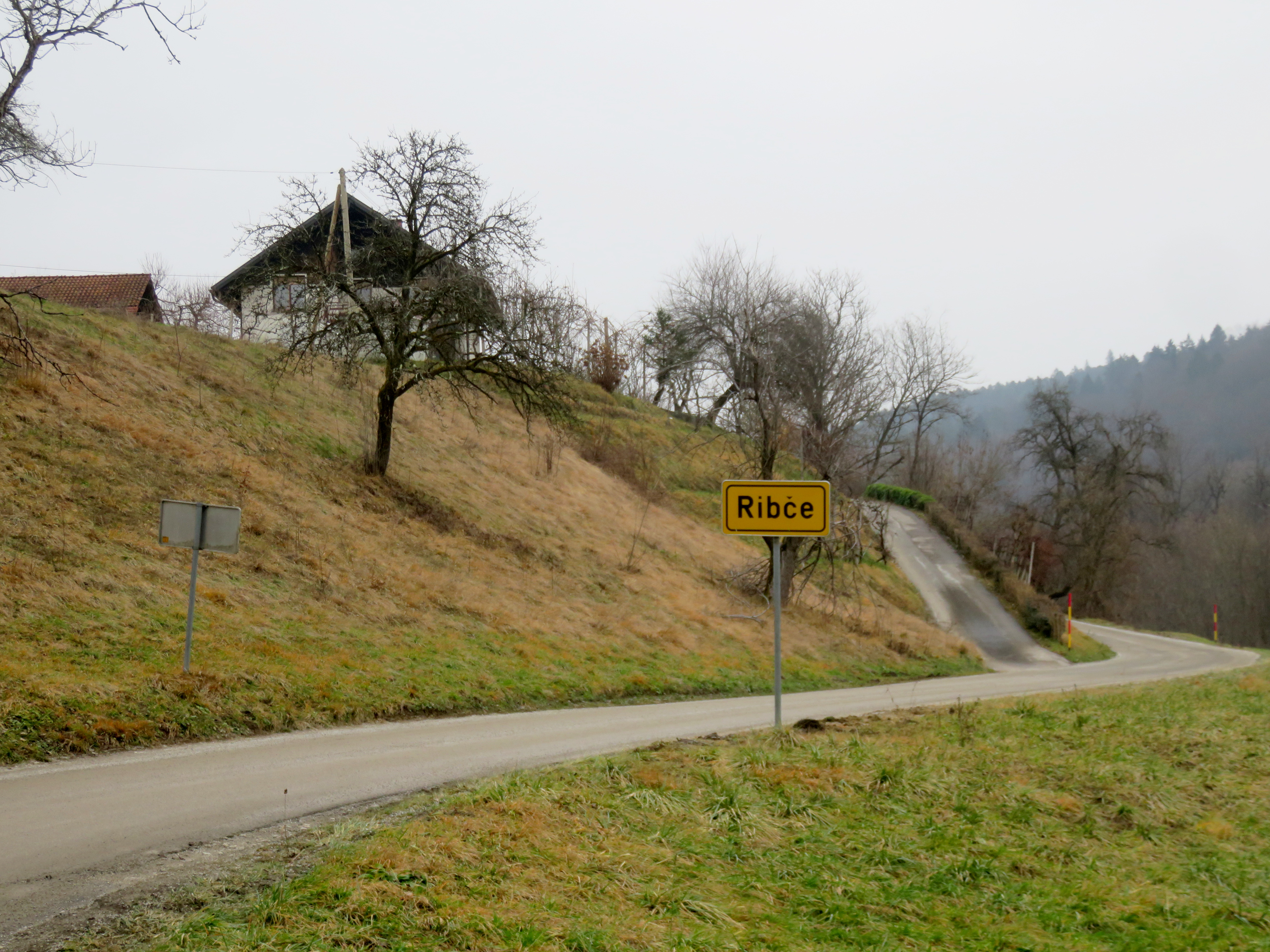

- Location in Slovenia
- Coordinates: 46°5′58.39″N 14°46′13.51″E
- Country: Slovenia
- Traditional region: Upper Carniola
- Statistical region: Central Sava
- Municipality: Litija

Area
  - Total: 2.01 km^{2} (0.78 sq mi)
- Elevation: 272.1 m (893 ft)

Population (2025)
  - Total: 194
- Postal code: 1281

Ribče (pronounced [ˈɾiːptʃɛ]; in older sources also Ribiče, German: Fischern) is a settlement on the left bank of the Sava River, opposite Kresnice, in the Municipality of Litija in central Slovenia. The area is part of the traditional region of Upper Carniola. It is now included with the rest of the municipality in the Central Sava Statistical Region. It includes the hamlets of Spodnje Ribče (German: Unterfischern), Zgornje Ribče (German: Oberfischern), Podreber, and Dašnik.
