= Dašnik =

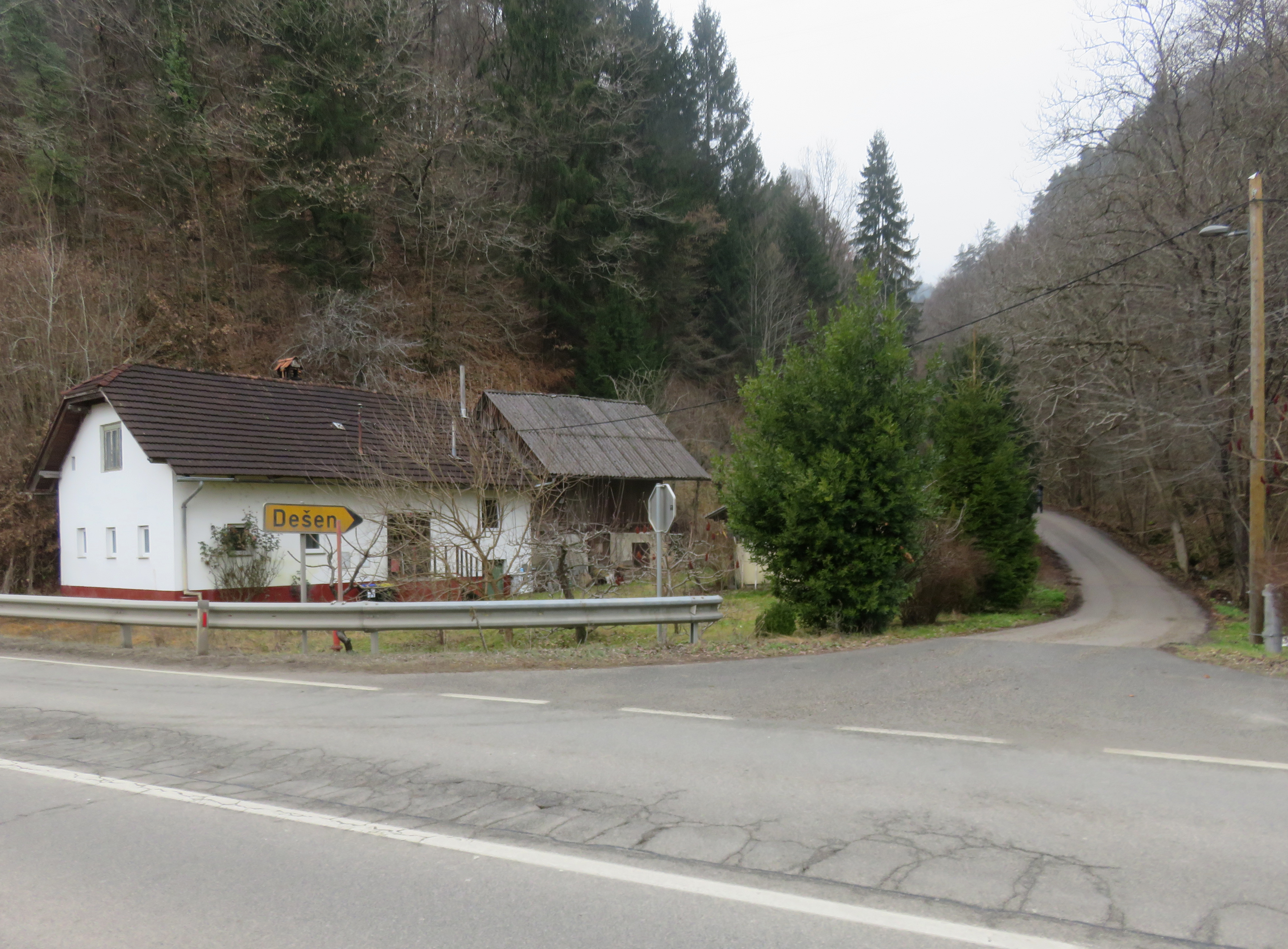

- Location in Slovenia
- Coordinates: 46°6′25″N 14°46′56″E
- Country: Slovenia
- Traditional region: Upper Carniola
- Statistical region: Central Sava
- Municipality: Litija
- Elevation: 255 m (837 ft)

Dašnik (pronounced [ˈdaːʃnik], German: Daschnik) is a former settlement in the Municipality of Litija in central Slovenia. It is now part of the village of Ribče. The area is part of the traditional region of Upper Carniola and is now included with the rest of the municipality in the Central Sava Statistical Region.

== Geography ==
Dašnik stands on the left bank of the Sava River, in the extreme eastern part of the territory of Ribče, along the road from Litija to Dol pri Ljubljani. Dešen Creek (Slovene: Dešenski potok), a tributary of the Sava, flows through the hamlet.

== History ==
Dašnik had a population of 14 living in 3 houses in 1900. Dašnik was assigned to Ribče in 1953, ending any existence it had as a separate settlement.
