= Jevnica =

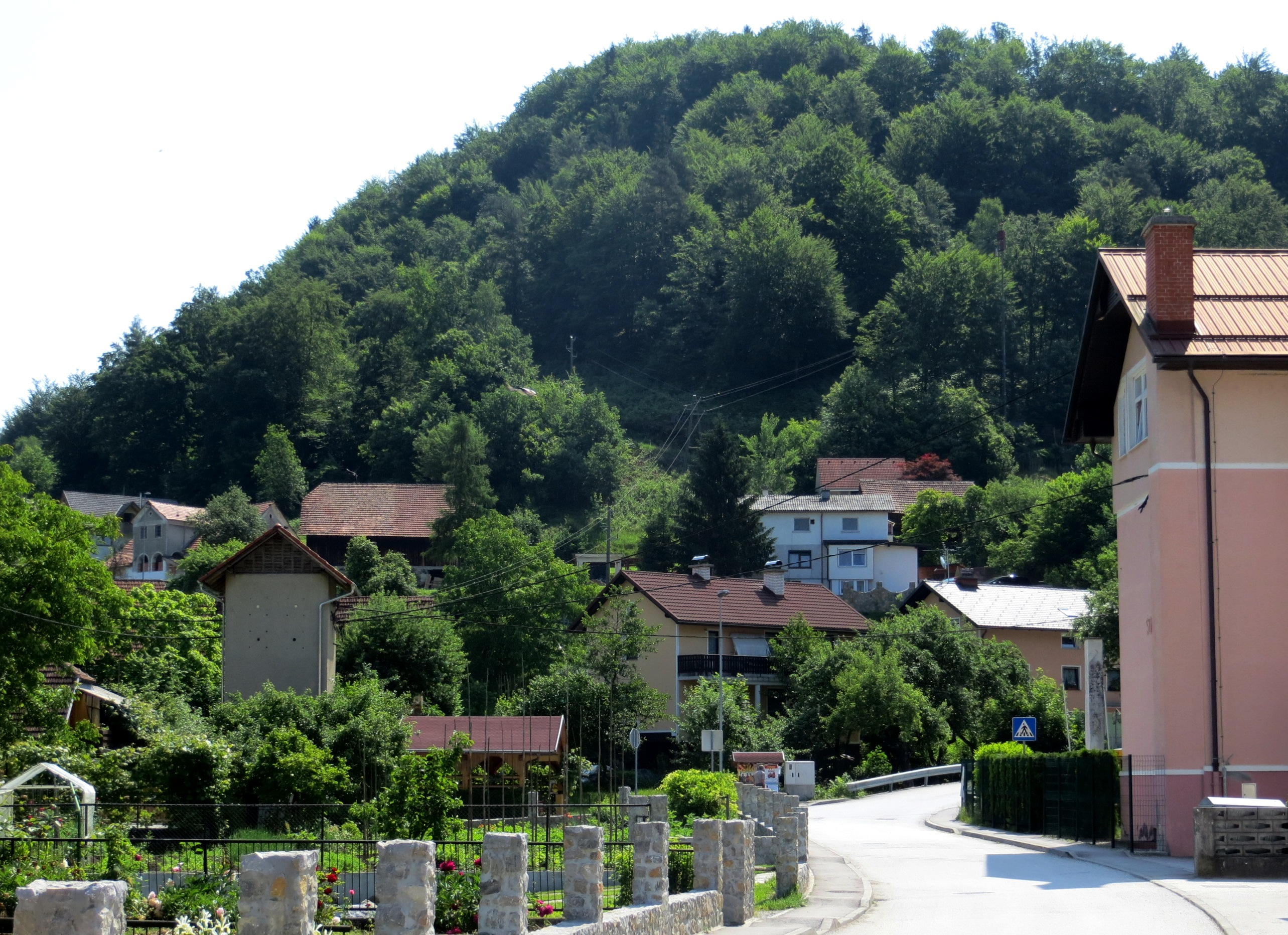

- Location in Slovenia
- Coordinates: 46°4′58.16″N 14°43′52.25″E
- Country: Slovenia
- Traditional region: Lower Carniola
- Statistical region: Central Sava
- Municipality: Litija

Area
  - Total: 1.82 km^{2} (0.70 sq mi)
- Elevation: 272.7 m (895 ft)

Population (2002)
  - Total: 367
- Postal code: 1281

Jevnica (pronounced [ˈjeːu̯nitsa]) is a settlement on the right bank of the Sava River in the Municipality of Litija in central Slovenia. The railway line from Ljubljana to Zidani Most runs through the settlement. The area is part of the traditional region of Lower Carniola. It is now included with the rest of the municipality in the Central Sava Statistical Region; until January 2014 the municipality was part of the Central Slovenia Statistical Region.

== Name ==
Jevnica was first attested in written sources in 1449 as an der Gelnicz. The settlement is probably named after Jevnica Creek, a hydronym derived from the Slovene common noun jela 'fir', thus referring to the local vegetation. Locally, the settlement is also known as Vevnica, an example of assimilation at a distance.

== History ==
At the beginning of the 20th century, Jevnica had only three houses and was a hamlet of Kresniške Poljane. The oldest house in the settlement is the Šepak house, which was built from boards from boats used to navigate the Sava River. A school was established in the Šepak house in 1921. The railway station in the town was opened in 1927, and a separate building for the school was built in 1929. During the Second World War, a Partisan business committee was headquartered in Jevnica, and it was also on the Partisan's dispatch route between Lower Carniola and Styria. Many of the residents joined the Partisan movement on 6 January 1943. A plaque on the Pintar house states that the woman living there burned to death when German forces burned the house in November 1944. A community center with a store, bar, and hall was built in Jevnica in 1948.

== Gallery ==
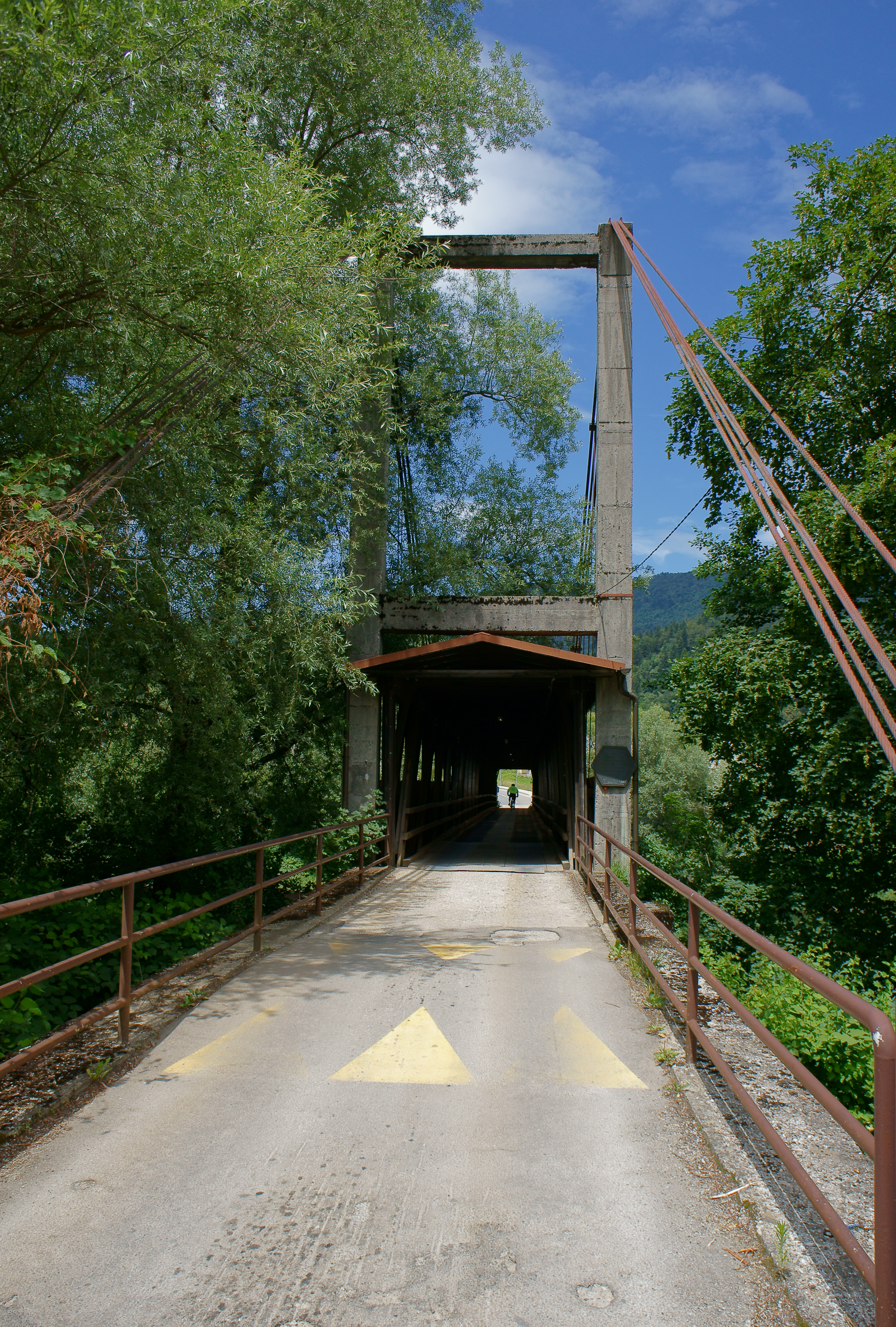
Covered bridge over the Sava River in Jevnica
