= Kresnice =

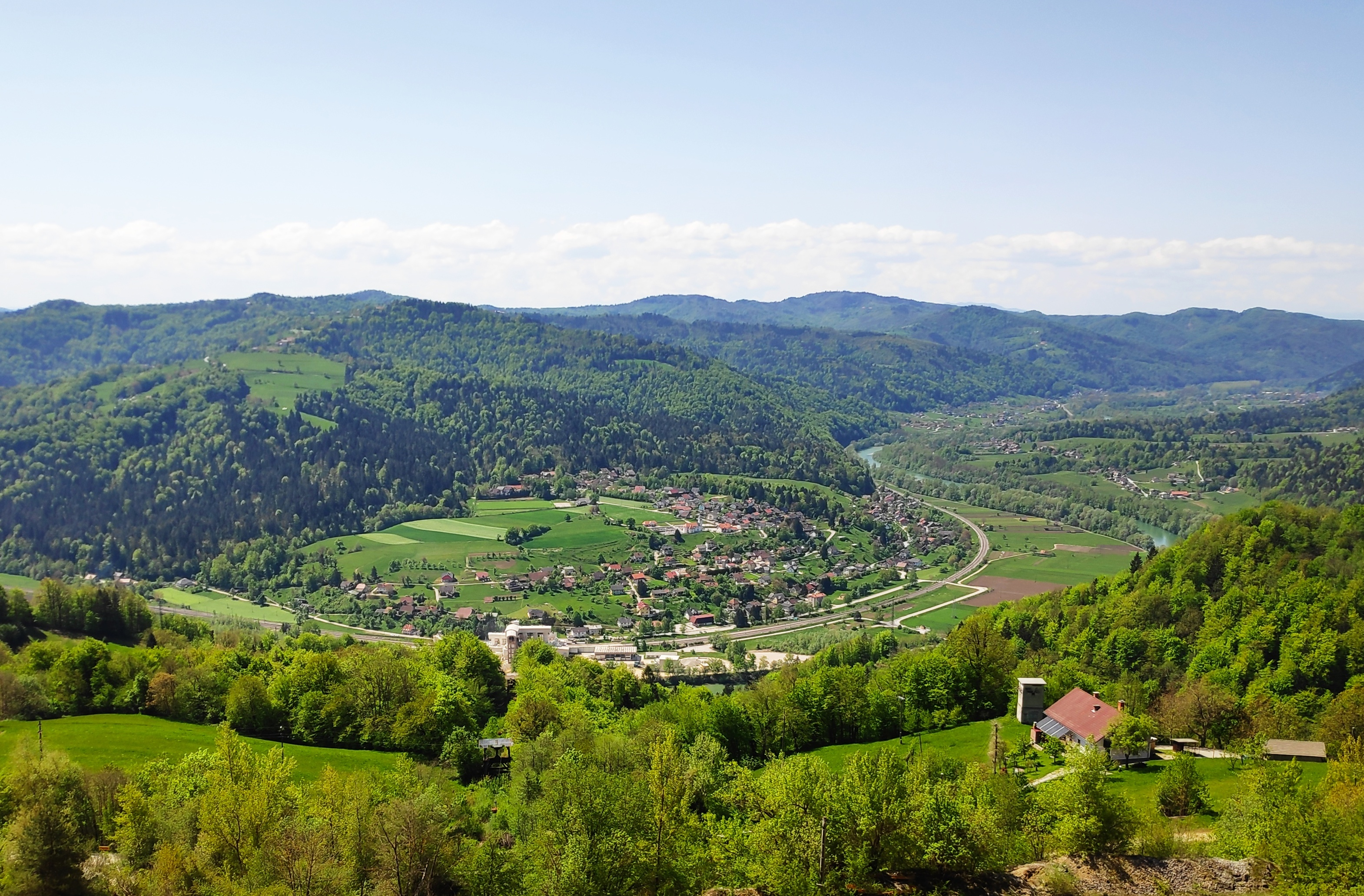

- Location in Slovenia
- Coordinates: 46°6′1.12″N 14°47′25.21″E
- Country: Slovenia
- Traditional region: Lower Carniola
- Statistical region: Central Sava
- Municipality: Litija

Area
  - Total: 2.7 km^{2} (1.0 sq mi)
- Elevation: 295.1 m (968 ft)

Population (2026)
  - Total: 727
- Postal code: 1281

Kresnice (pronounced [kɾɛˈsniːtsɛ]; German: Kreßnitz) is a settlement on the right bank of the Sava River in the Municipality of Litija in central Slovenia. The area is part of the traditional region of Lower Carniola. It is now included with the rest of the municipality in the Central Sava Statistical Region; until January 2014 the municipality was part of the Central Slovenia Statistical Region.

== Name ==
Kresnice was mentioned in written sources ca. 1261 as villa Grafnitz (and as ze Kräznicz in 1372, Cråzznicz in 1380, and Krasnicz in 1449). The name is derived from the Slovene common noun kres 'summer solstice; solstice bonfire' and may indicate a place where such bonfires were held.

== Church ==
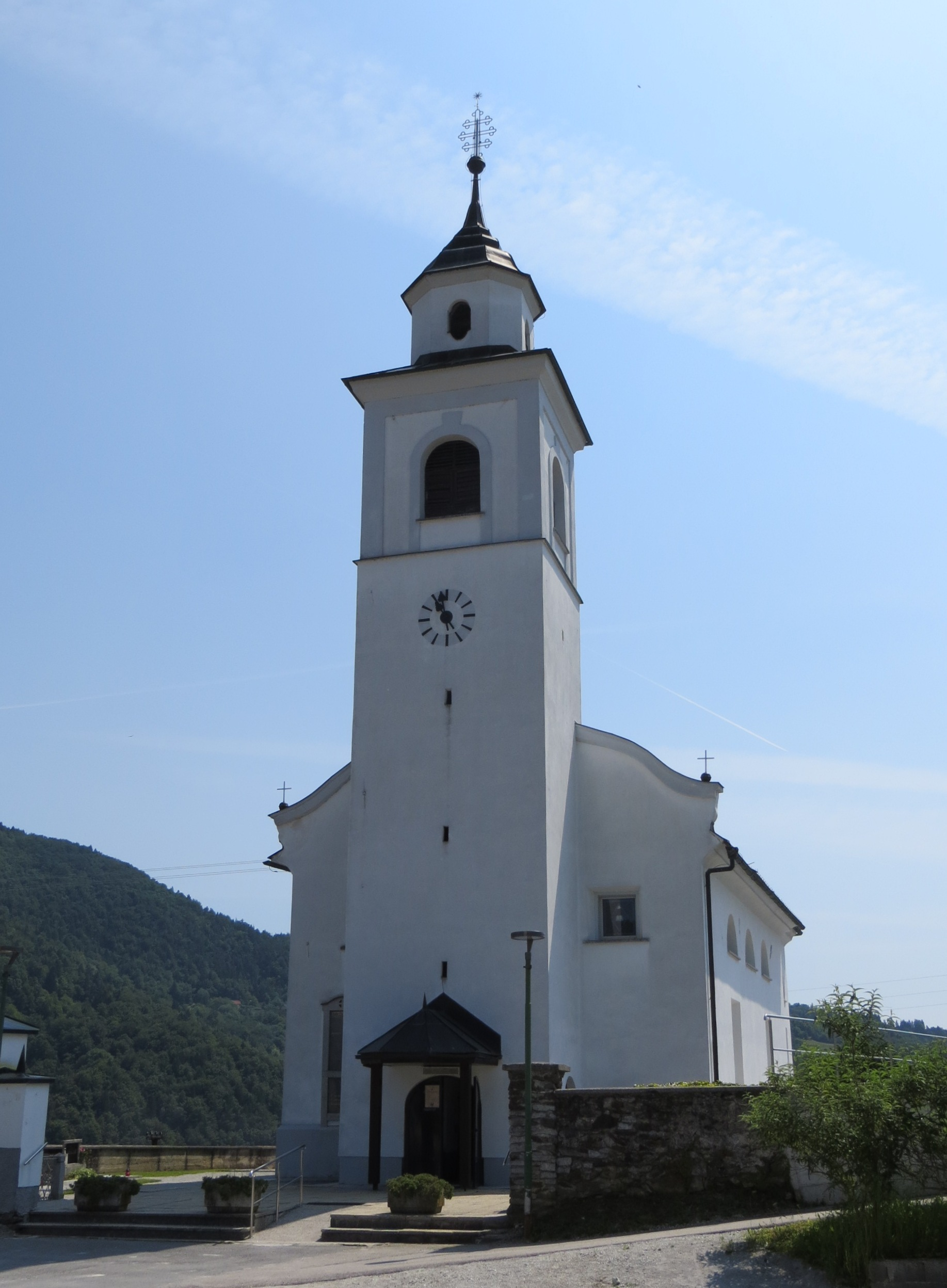
Saint Benedict's Church

The parish church in the settlement is dedicated to Saint Benedict and belongs to the Roman Catholic Archdiocese of Ljubljana. It dates to the early 19th century.
