= Planjava, Dešen =

Planjava
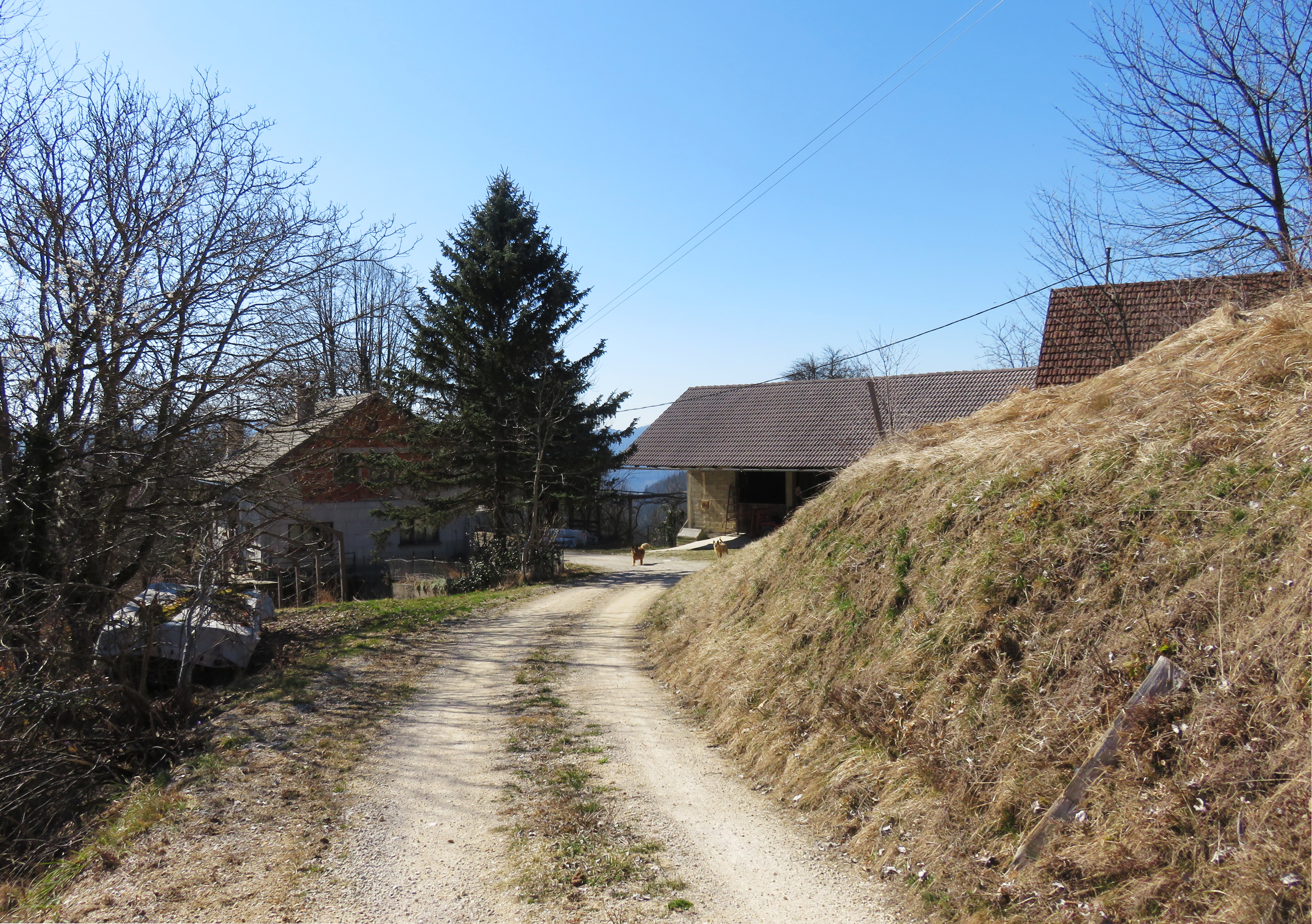

- Location in Slovenia
- Coordinates: 46°6′44″N 14°47′16″E
- Country: Slovenia
- Traditional region: Upper Carniola
- Statistical region: Central Slovenia
- Municipality: Moravče
- Elevation: 492 m (1,614 ft)

Planjava (Slovene pronunciation: [plaˈnjaːʋa], in older sources also Planava) is a former settlement in the Municipality of Moravče in central Slovenia. It is now part of the village of Dešen. The area is part of the traditional region of Upper Carniola. The municipality is now included in the Central Slovenia Statistical Region.

== Geography ==
Planjava lies in the southern part of the village of Dešen, below the southwestern slope of Slivna Hill (elevation: 867 meters or 2,844 feet).

== History ==
Planjava had a population of eight living in one house in 1900. Planjava was annexed by Dešen in 1953, ending its existence as an independent settlement.
