= Žerenk =

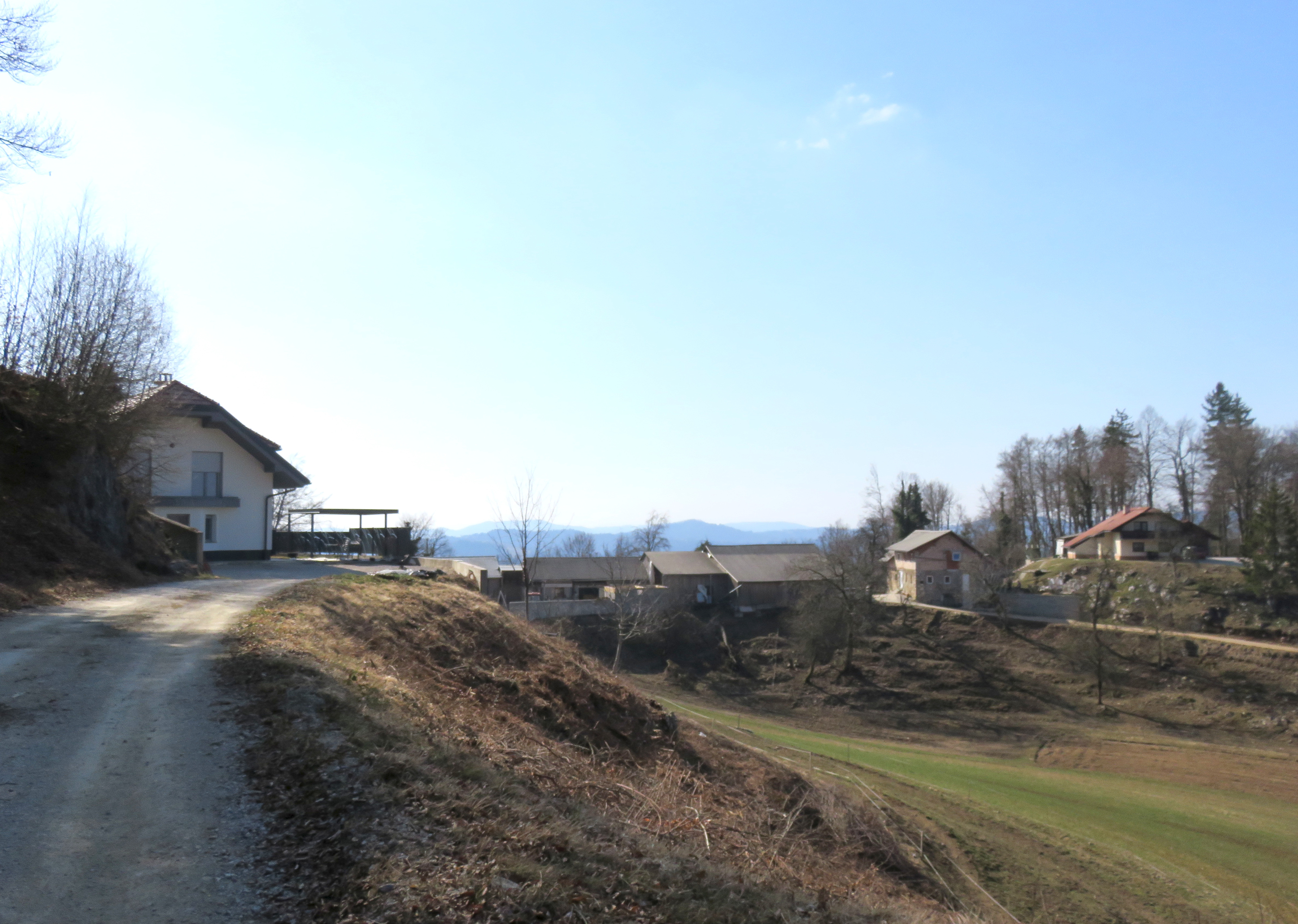

- Location in Slovenia
- Coordinates: 46°7′20″N 14°46′22″E
- Country: Slovenia
- Traditional region: Upper Carniola
- Statistical region: Central Slovenia
- Municipality: Moravče
- Elevation: 668 m (2,192 ft)

Žerenk (Slovene pronunciation: [ʒɛˈɾeːŋk], in older sources also Žerenik, German: Schereng) is a former settlement in the Municipality of Moravče in central Slovenia. It is now part of the village of Dešen. The area is part of the traditional region of Upper Carniola. The municipality is now included in the Central Slovenia Statistical Region.

== Geography ==
Žerenk lies in the northwestern part the village of Dešen, below the west slope of Ribič Hill (elevation: 727 metres or 2,385 feet). It corresponds to the hamlet of Ribič.

== History ==
Žerenk had a population of 15 living in two houses in 1900. Žerenk was annexed by Dešen in 1952, ending its existence as an independent settlement.
