= Ušte, Moravče =

Ušte
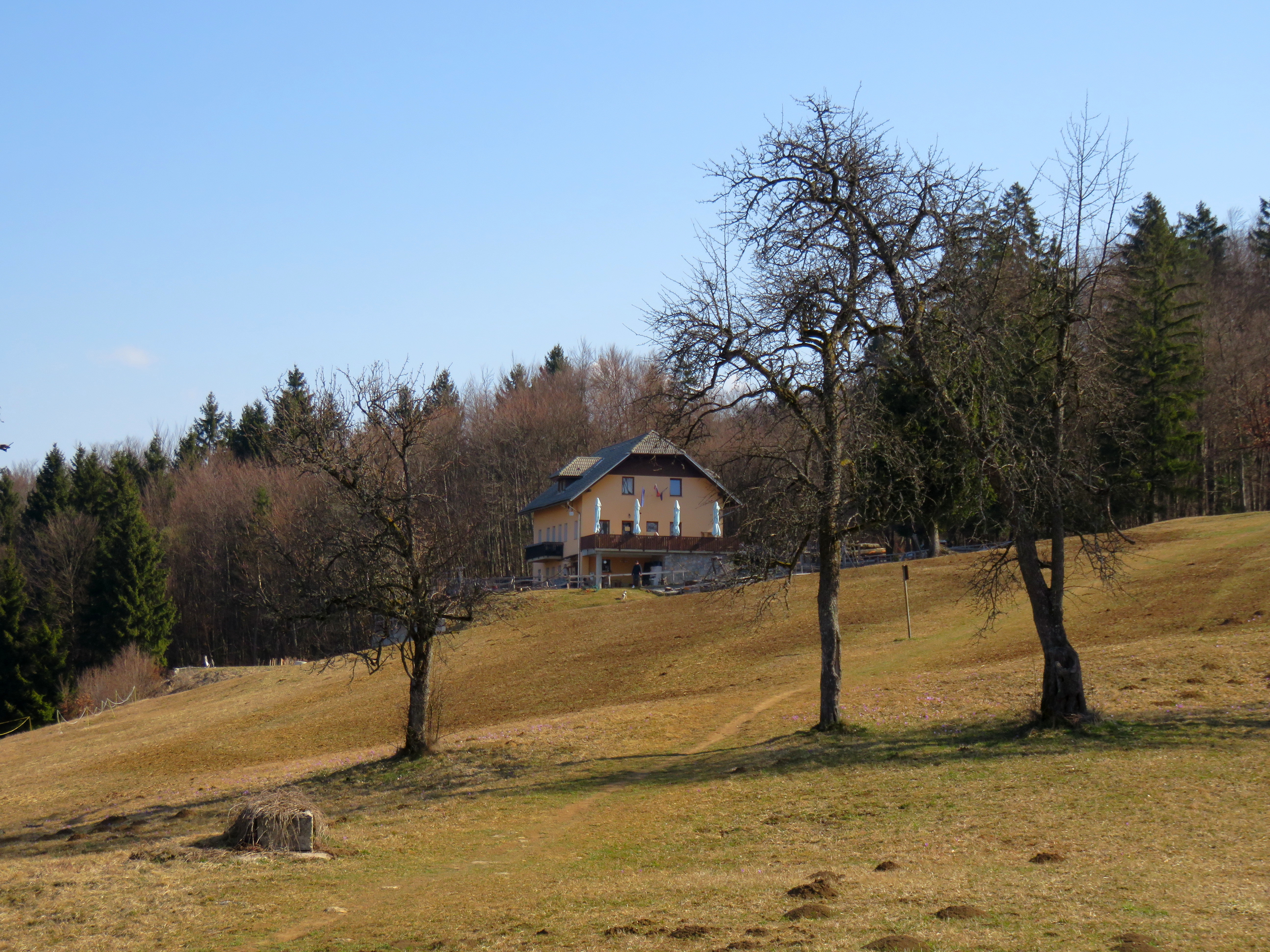

- Location in Slovenia
- Coordinates: 46°7′18″N 14°46′31″E
- Country: Slovenia
- Traditional region: Upper Carniola
- Statistical region: Central Slovenia
- Municipality: Moravče
- Elevation: 655 m (2,149 ft)

Ušte (Slovene pronunciation: [ˈuːʃtɛ]) is a former settlement in the Municipality of Moravče in central Slovenia. It is now part of the village of Dešen. The area is part of the traditional region of Upper Carniola. The municipality is now included in the Central Slovenia Statistical Region.

== Geography ==
Ušte lies in the northwestern part the village of Dešen, below the west slope of Ribič Hill (elevation: 727 metres or 2,385 feet).

== History ==
Ušte had a population of six living in one house in 1900. Ušte was annexed by Dešen in 1952, ending its existence as an independent settlement.
