= Cvetež, Moravče =

Cvetež
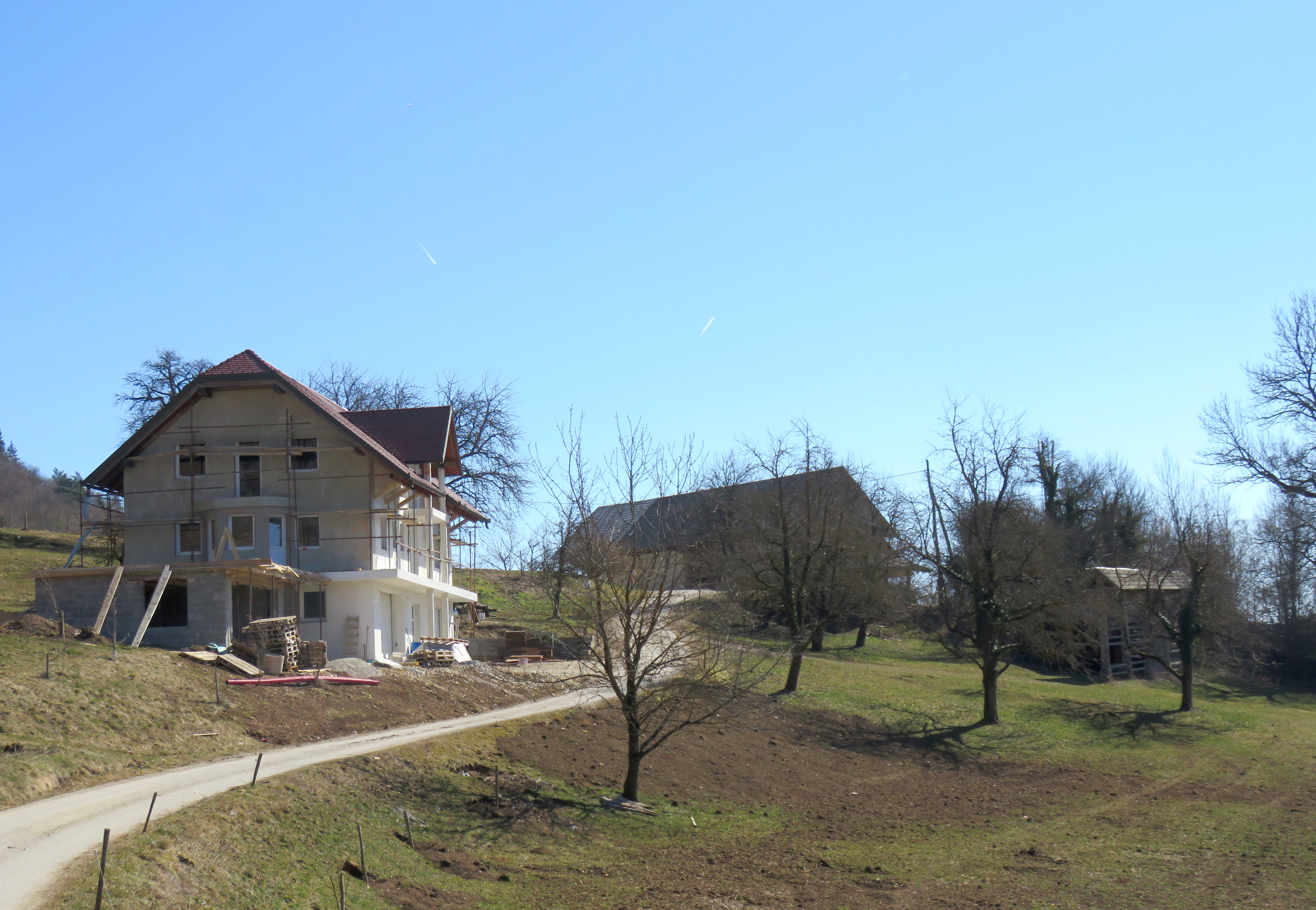

- Location in Slovenia
- Coordinates: 46°6′59″N 14°47′47″E
- Country: Slovenia
- Traditional region: Upper Carniola
- Statistical region: Central Slovenia
- Municipality: Moravče
- Elevation: 695 m (2,280 ft)

Cvetež (Slovene pronunciation: [ˈtsʋeːtɛʃ], in older sources also Cveteš, German: Zwetesch) is a former settlement in the Municipality of Moravče in central Slovenia. It is now part of the village of Dešen. The area is part of the traditional region of Upper Carniola. The municipality is now included in the Central Slovenia Statistical Region.

== Geography ==
Cvetež lies in the eastern part of the village of Dešen, below the southeast slope of Slivna Hill (elevation: 867 meters or 2,844 feet).

== History ==
Cvetež was annexed by Dešen in 1952, ending its existence as an independent settlement.
