= Dešen =

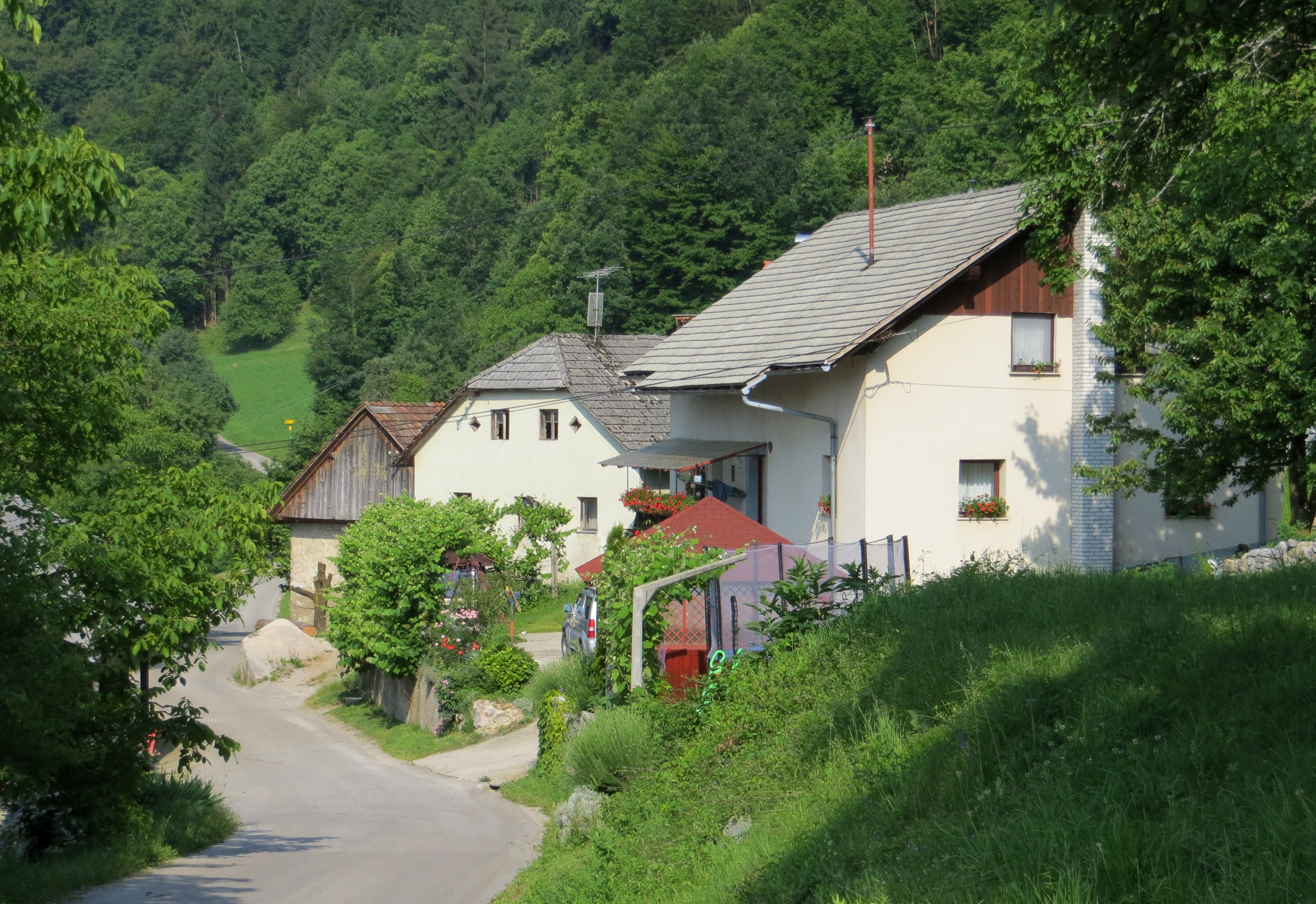

- Location in Slovenia
- Coordinates: 46°7′8.15″N 14°47′11.91″E
- Country: Slovenia
- Traditional region: Upper Carniola
- Statistical region: Central Slovenia
- Municipality: Moravče

Area
  - Total: 3.41 km^{2} (1.32 sq mi)
- Elevation: 644.6 m (2,115 ft)

Population (2002)
  - Total: 97
- Postal code: 1281

Dešen (pronounced [ˈdəʃən]; in older sources also Dešnje, German: Deschne) is a settlement in the Municipality of Moravče in central Slovenia. The area is part of the traditional region of Upper Carniola. It is now included with the rest of the municipality in the Central Slovenia Statistical Region.

== Name ==
Dešen was attested in historical sources as Daeschin in 1346, Deschen in 1430, Deschin in 1436, and Daͤschen in 1451.

== History ==
Archaeological evidence shows that the area has been settled since the Bronze Age.
