= Morihiko Saito =

Japanese mathematician (born 1961)

Morihiko Saitō (斎藤 盛彦, Saitō Morihiko, born 1961) is a Japanese mathematician, specializing in algebraic analysis and algebraic geometry.

== Education and career ==
After graduating from Aiko High School in Matsuyama, Saito completed undergraduate study in mathematics at the University of Tokyo and in 1979 completed the master's program there. In 1986 he received his D.Sc. from Kyoto University. After working as a research assistant at Kyoto University's Research Institute for Mathematical Sciences, he was appointed there an associate professor.

In 1988/1990 he introduced the theory of mixed Hodge modules, based on the theory of D-modules in algebraic analysis, the theory of perverse sheaves, and the theory of variation of Hodge structures and mixed Hodge structures (introduced by Pierre Deligne) in algebraic geometry. This led, among other things, to a generalization of the fundamental decomposition theorems of Alexander Beilinson, Joseph Bernstein, Deligne, and Ofer Gabber about perverse sheaves in positive characteristic to characteristic 0. The theory of Hodge D-modules forms the starting point for the theory of the twistor D-modules developed by Claude Sabbah and Takurō Mochizuki, which lead to led to another generalization of the Beilinson–Bernstein–Deligne–Gabber theorem by Mochizuki.

In 2006 Saito, with Nero Budur and Mircea Mustață, generalized the notion of a Bernstein–Sato polynomial (aka b-function or b-polynomial) to an arbitrary variety.

Saito's research deals with "applications of the theory of mixed Hodge modules to algebraic geometry, including the theories of singularities, algebraic cycles, characteristic classes, and so on."

In 1990 he was an Invited Speaker with talk Mixed Hodge Modules and Applications at the International Congress of Mathematicians in Kyoto. In 1991 he was awarded the Spring Prize of the Mathematical Society of Japan.

== Selected publications ==
- "Hodge structure via filtered D-Modules" (PDF). Astérisque. 179–180: 342–351. 1985.
- Saito, Morihiko (1988). "Modules de Hodge polarisables". Publ. RIMS, Kyoto Univ. 24 (6): 849–995. doi:10.2977/prims/1195173930. (over 600 citations)
- Saito, Morihiko (1989). "On the structure of Brieskorn lattice". Annales de l'Institut Fourier. 39 (1): 27–72. doi:10.5802/aif.1157.
- "Introduction to mixed Hodge modules" (PDF). Astérisque. 179–180: 145–162. 1989; in Actes du Colloque de théorie de Hodge, Luminy, 1–6 Juin 1987
- Saito, Morihiko (1990). "Mixed Hodge modules". Publ. RIMS, Kyoto Univ. 26 (2): 221–333. doi:10.2977/prims/1195171082. (over 600 citations)
- Saito, Morihiko (1990). "Decomposition theorem for proper Kähler morphisms". Tohoku Mathematical Journal. Second Series. 42 (2): 127–148. doi:10.2748/tmj/1178227650. MR 1053945.
- Budur, Nero; Saito, Morihiko (2005). "Multiplier ideals, V-filtration, and spectrum". Journal of Algebraic Geometry. 14 (2): 269–282. arXiv:math/0305118. doi:10.1090/S1056-3911-04-00398-4. MR 2123230. S2CID 11520237.
