= Propagation of singularities theorem =

In microlocal analysis, the propagation of singularities theorem (also called the Duistermaat–Hörmander theorem) is theorem which characterizes the wavefront set of the distributional solution of the partial (pseudo) differential equation

$$Pu=f$$

for a pseudodifferential operator $P$ on a smooth manifold. It says that the propagation of singularities follows the bicharacteristic flow of the principal symbol of $P$.

The theorem appeared 1972 in a work on Fourier integral operators by Johannes Jisse Duistermaat and Lars Hörmander and since then there have been many generalizations which are known under the name propagation of singularities.

== Propagation of singularities theorem ==
We use the following notation:

- $X$ is a $C^{\infty}$-differentiable manifold, and $C^{\infty}_0(X)$ is the space of smooth functions $u$ with a compact set $K \subset X$, such that $u \mid{X\setminus K} = 0$.
- $L^m_{\sigma,\delta}(X)$ denotes the class of pseudodifferential operators of type $(\sigma,\delta)$ with symbol $a(x,y,\theta) \in S^m_{\sigma,\delta}(X \times X \times \mathbb{R}^n)$.
- $S^m_{\sigma,\delta}$ is the Hörmander symbol class.
- $L_1^m(X) := L^m_{1,0}(X)$.
- $D'(X) = (C^{\infty}_{0}(X))^*$ is the space of distributions, the Dual space of $C^{\infty}_{0}(X)$.
- $WF(u)$ is the wave front set of $u$
- $\operatorname{char} p_m$ is the characteristic set of the principal symbol $p_m$

=== Statement ===
Let $P$ be a properly supported pseudodifferential operator of class $L_1^m(X)$ with a real principal symbol $p_m(x, \xi)$, which is homogeneous of degree $m$ in $\xi$. Let $u \in D'(X)$ be a distribution that satisfies the equation $Pu = f$, then it follows that

$$WF(u) \setminus WF(f) \subset \operatorname{char} p_m.$$

Furthermore, $WF(u) \setminus WF(f)$ is invariant under the Hamiltonian flow induced by $p_m$.

== Bibliography ==
- Hörmander, Lars (1972). Fourier integral operators. I. Acta Mathematica. Vol. 128. Institut Mittag-Leffler. pp. 79–183. doi:10.1007/BF02392052.
- Duistermaat, Johannes Jisse; Hörmander, Lars (1972). Fourier integral operators. II. Acta Mathematica. Vol. 128. Institut Mittag-Leffler. pp. 183–269. doi:10.1007/BF02392165.
- Shubin, Mikhail A. Pseudodifferential Operators and Spectral Theory. Springer Berlin, Heidelberg. ISBN 978-3-540-41195-6.
- Taylor, Michael E. (1978). "Propagation, reflection, and diffraction of singularities of solutions to wave equations". Bulletin of the American Mathematical Society. 84 (4). American Mathematical Society: 589–611.
