= Michio Jimbo =

Japanese mathematician (born 1951)

- 神保 道夫
- Born: November 28, 1951 (age 74); Chiba, Japan
- Education: University of Tokyo (BS); Kyoto University (MS, PhD)
- Known for: Quantum groups Isomonodromic deformation Holonomic quantum fields
- Awards: Japan Academy Prize (1993); Wigner Medal (2010); Heineman Prize (2013)
- Scientific career
- Fields: Mathematical physics
- Workplaces: Rikkyo University; University of Tokyo; Kyoto University
- Doctoral advisor: Mikio Sato

Michio Jimbo (神保 道夫, Jimbō Michio; born November 28, 1951) is a Japanese mathematician working in mathematical physics. He is known for his introduction of quantum groups (independently of Vladimir Drinfeld), his contributions to the theory of integrable systems and their correlation functions, and his work with Mikio Sato and Tetsuji Miwa on holonomic quantum fields and isomonodromic deformation theory.

== Education and career ==
Jimbo was born in Chiba, Japan. He received his bachelor's degree from the University of Tokyo in 1974 and entered graduate study at the Research Institute for Mathematical Sciences (RIMS) at Kyoto University under the supervision of Mikio Sato. He received his master's degree from Kyoto University in 1976 and his doctorate in 1986. Between 1976 and 1988, Jimbo worked as a research associate at RIMS. In 1988 he became an associate professor in the Department of Mathematics at Kyoto University, where he was later promoted to full professor. In 2000 he moved to the University of Tokyo. He is currently a specially appointed professor at Rikkyo University in Tokyo.

== Research ==
=== Holonomic quantum fields and isomonodromic deformation ===
In the late 1970s, Jimbo, together with Sato and Miwa, developed the theory of holonomic quantum fields, establishing an unexpected connection between isomonodromic deformation theory for linear differential equations and quantum field theory. This work provided a field-theoretic framework for the correlation functions of the two-dimensional Ising model and led to connections with Painlevé transcendents.

=== Quantum groups ===
In 1985, Jimbo introduced a q-deformation of the universal enveloping algebra of a simple Lie algebra, independently of Drinfeld's contemporaneous work on Hopf algebras and the quantum Yang–Baxter equation. These structures, now known as quantum groups or Drinfeld–Jimbo algebras, have had far-reaching applications in representation theory, knot theory, and exactly solvable models in statistical mechanics.

=== Integrable hierarchies ===
Working with Etsurō Date, Masaki Kashiwara, and Miwa, Jimbo developed the theory of τ-functions for the KP (Kadomtsev–Petviashvili) integrable hierarchy and related hierarchies, connecting them to the representation theory of infinite-dimensional Lie algebras.

== Awards and honours ==
Jimbo has received several major awards for his contributions to mathematical physics, often jointly with his long-time collaborator Tetsuji Miwa:

- 1987 – Autumn Prize of the Mathematical Society of Japan (with Tetsuji Miwa)
- 1993 – Japan Academy Prize
- 1999 – Asahi Prize (with Tetsuji Miwa)
- 2010 – Wigner Medal, "for his introduction of quantum groups and his study of affine Lie algebras, in connection with classical and quantum integrable systems"
- 2013 – Dannie Heineman Prize for Mathematical Physics (with Tetsuji Miwa), "for profound developments in integrable systems and their correlation functions in statistical mechanics and quantum field theory, making use of quantum groups, algebraic analysis, and deformation theory"

== Selected publications ==
=== Books ===
- with Tetsuji Miwa and Fedor Smirnov: Local Operators in Integrable Models I. American Mathematical Soc, 2021. ISBN 978-1-4704-6552-0
- with Tetsuji Miwa and Etsurō Date: Solitons: Differential Equations, Symmetries and Infinite Dimensional Algebras. Cambridge University Press, 2000. ISBN 0-521-56161-2
- with Tetsuji Miwa: Algebraic Analysis of Solvable Lattice Models. CBMS Regional Conference Series in Mathematics, No. 85. American Mathematical Society, 1995. ISBN 0-8218-0320-4
- Editor: Yang–Baxter Equation in Integrable Systems. Advanced Series in Mathematical Physics, Vol. 10. World Scientific, 1990. doi:10.1142/1021

=== Articles ===
- Jimbo, Michio (1985). "A q-difference analogue of U(𝔤) and the Yang–Baxter equation". Letters in Mathematical Physics. 10 (1): 63–69. Bibcode:1985LMaPh..10...63J. doi:10.1007/BF00704588. S2CID 120703708.
- Jimbo, Michio (1986). "A q-analogue of U(𝔤𝔩(N+1)), Hecke algebra, and the Yang–Baxter equation". Letters in Mathematical Physics. 11 (3): 247–252. Bibcode:1986LMaPh..11..247J. doi:10.1007/BF00400222. S2CID 121244606.
