= Fourier–Bros–Iagolnitzer transform =

Mathematical transform

In mathematics, the FBI transform or Fourier–Bros–Iagolnitzer transform is a generalization of the Fourier transform developed by the French mathematical physicists Jacques Bros and Daniel Iagolnitzer in order to characterise the local analyticity of functions (or distributions) on R^{n}. The transform provides an alternative approach to analytic wave front sets of distributions, developed independently by the Japanese mathematicians Mikio Sato, Masaki Kashiwara and Takahiro Kawai in their approach to microlocal analysis. It can also be used to prove the analyticity of solutions of analytic elliptic partial differential equations as well as a version of the classical uniqueness theorem, strengthening the Cauchy–Kowalevski theorem, due to the Swedish mathematician Erik Albert Holmgren (1872–1943).

== Definitions ==
The Fourier transform of a Schwartz function f in S(R^{n}) is defined by

$$({\mathcal F}f)(t) = (2\pi)^{-n / 2} \int_{{\mathbf R}^n}f(x) e^{-ix \cdot t}\, dx.$$

The FBI transform of f is defined for a ≥ 0 by

$$({\mathcal F}_a f)(t,y) = (2\pi)^{-n / 2} \int_{{\mathbf R}^n}f(x)e^{-a |x-y|^2/2} e^{-ix \cdot t}\, dx.$$

Thus, when a = 0, it essentially coincides with the Fourier transform.

The same formulas can be used to define the Fourier and FBI transforms of tempered distributions in S'(R^{n}).

== Inversion formula ==
The Fourier inversion formula

$$f(x)= {\mathcal F}^2 f(-x)$$

allows a function f to be recovered from its Fourier transform.

In particular

$$f(x)= (2\pi)^{-n/2}\int_{{\mathbf R}^n} e^{i t \cdot x}{\mathcal F}(f)(t) \, dt$$

Similarly, at a positive value of a, f(0) can be recovered from the FBI transform of f(x) by the inversion formula

$$f(x)= (2\pi)^{-n/2}\int_{{\mathbf R}^n} e^{i t \cdot x}e^{a|x-y|^2/2}{\mathcal F}_a (f)(t,y) \, dt$$

== Criterion for local analyticity ==
Bros and Iagolnitzer showed that a distribution f is locally equal to a real analytic function at y, in the direction ξ if and only if its FBI transform satisfies an inequality of the form

$$|({\mathcal F}_{|\xi|}f)(\xi,y)| \le C e^{-\varepsilon |\xi|},$$

for |ξ| sufficiently large.

== Holmgren's uniqueness theorem ==
A simple consequence of the Bros and Iagolnitzer characterisation of local analyticity is the following regularity result of Lars Hörmander and Mikio Sato.

Theorem. Let P be an elliptic partial differential operator with analytic coefficients defined on an open subset X of R^{n}. If Pf is analytic in X, then so too is f.

When "analytic" is replaced by "smooth" in this theorem, the result is just Hermann Weyl's classical lemma on elliptic regularity, usually proved using Sobolev spaces. It is a special case of more general results involving the analytic wave front set (see below), which imply Holmgren's classical strengthening of the Cauchy–Kowalevski theorem on linear partial differential equations with real analytic coefficients. In modern language, Holmgren's uniqueness theorem states that any distributional solution of such a system of equations must be analytic and therefore unique, by the Cauchy–Kowalevski theorem.

== The analytic wave front set ==
The analytic wave front set or singular spectrum WF_{A}(f) of a distribution f (or more generally of a hyperfunction) can be defined in terms of the FBI transform as the complement of the conical set of points (x, λ ξ) (λ > 0) such that the FBI transform satisfies the Bros–Iagolnitzer inequality

$$|({\mathcal F}_{|\xi|}f)(\xi,y)| \le C e^{-\varepsilon |\xi|},$$

for y the point at which one would like to test for analyticity, and |ξ| sufficiently large and pointing in the direction one would like to look for the wave front, that is, the direction at which the singularity at y, if it exists, propagates. J.M. Bony proved that this definition coincided with other definitions introduced independently by Sato, Kashiwara and Kawai and by Hörmander. If P is an mth order linear differential operator having analytic coefficients

$$P =\sum_{|\alpha|\le m} a_\alpha(x) D^\alpha,$$

with principal symbol

$$\sigma_P(x,\xi) = \sum_{|\alpha|= m} a_\alpha(x) \xi^\alpha,$$

and characteristic variety

$${\rm char}\, P =\{(x,\xi): \xi\ne0, \, \sigma_P(x,\xi) =0\},$$

then

- $\operatorname{WF}_A(Pf) \subseteq \operatorname{WF}_A(f)$
- $\operatorname{WF}_A(f) \subseteq \operatorname{WF}_A(Pf) \cup \operatorname{char} P.$

In particular, when P is elliptic, char P = ø, so that

WF_{A}(Pf) = WF_{A}(f).

This is a strengthening of the analytic version of elliptic regularity mentioned above.
