= Wolf Prize in Mathematics =

One of six awards by the Wolf Foundation

The Wolf Prize in Mathematics is awarded almost annually (Note: The Wolf Foundation describes the prize as annual; however, some prizes are split across years, while in some years no prize is awarded.) by the Wolf Foundation in Israel. It is one of the six Wolf Prizes established by the foundation and awarded since 1978; the others are in agriculture, chemistry, medicine, physics and arts. The Wolf Prize includes a monetary award of $100,000.

According to a reputation survey conducted in 2013 and 2014, the Wolf Prize in Mathematics is the third most prestigious international academic award in mathematics, after the Abel Prize and the Fields Medal.

== Laureates ==
Year	Name	Nationality	Citation
1978	Israel Gelfand	Soviet Union	for his work in functional analysis, group representation, and for his seminal contributions to many areas of mathematics and its applications.
1978	Carl L. Siegel	Germany	for his contributions to the theory of numbers, theory of several complex variables, and celestial mechanics.
1979	Jean Leray	France	for pioneering work on the development and application of topological methods to the study of differential equations.
1979	André Weil	France	for his inspired introduction of algebraic-geometric methods to the theory of numbers.
1980	Henri Cartan	France	for pioneering work in algebraic topology, complex variables, homological algebra and inspired leadership of a generation of mathematicians.
1980	Andrey Kolmogorov	Soviet Union	for deep and original discoveries in Fourier analysis, probability theory, ergodic theory and dynamical systems.
1981	Lars Ahlfors	Finland	for seminal discoveries and the creation of powerful new methods in geometric function theory.
1981	Oscar Zariski	United States	creator of the modern approach to algebraic geometry, by its fusion with commutative algebra.
1982	Hassler Whitney	United States	for his fundamental work in algebraic topology, differential geometry and differential topology.
1982	Mark Krein	Soviet Union	for his fundamental contributions to functional analysis and its applications.
1983/84	Shiing-Shen Chern	China; United States	for outstanding contributions to global differential geometry, which have profoundly influenced all mathematics.
1983/84	Paul Erdős	Hungary	for his numerous contributions to number theory, combinatorics, probability, set theory and mathematical analysis, and for personally stimulating mathematicians the world over.
1984/85	Kunihiko Kodaira	Japan	for his outstanding contributions to the study of complex manifolds and algebraic varieties.
1984/85	Hans Lewy	United States	for initiating many, now classic and essential, developments in partial differential equations.
1986	Samuel Eilenberg	Poland; United States	for his fundamental work in algebraic topology and homological algebra.
1986	Atle Selberg	Norway	for his profound and original work on number theory and on discrete groups and automorphic forms.
1987	Kiyoshi Itō	Japan	for his fundamental contributions to pure and applied probability theory, especially the creation of the stochastic differential and integral calculus.
1987	Peter Lax	Hungary; United States	for his outstanding contributions to many areas of analysis and applied mathematics.
1988	Friedrich Hirzebruch	Germany	for outstanding work combining topology, algebraic geometry and differential geometry, and algebraic number theory; and for his stimulation of mathematical cooperation and research.
1988	Lars Hörmander	Sweden	for fundamental work in modern analysis, in particular, the application of pseudo-differential operators and Fourier integral operators to linear partial differential equations.
1989	Alberto Calderón	Argentina	for his groundbreaking work on singular integral operators and their application to important problems in partial differential equations.
1989	John Milnor	United States	for ingenious and highly original discoveries in geometry, which have opened important new vistas in topology from the algebraic, combinatorial, and differentiable viewpoint.
1990	Ennio De Giorgi	Italy	for his innovating ideas and fundamental achievements in partial differential equations and calculus of variations.
1990	Ilya Piatetski-Shapiro	Soviet Union; Israel	for his fundamental contributions in the fields of homogeneous complex domains, discrete groups, representation theory and automorphic forms.
1991	No award		
1992	Lennart Carleson	Sweden	for his fundamental contributions to Fourier analysis, complex analysis, quasi-conformal mappings and dynamical systems.
1992	John G. Thompson	United States	for his profound contributions to all aspects of finite group theory and connections with other branches of mathematics.
1993	Mikhail Gromov	Russia; France	for his revolutionary contributions to global Riemannian and symplectic geometry, algebraic topology, geometric group theory and the theory of partial differential equations;
1993	Jacques Tits	Belgium; France	for his pioneering and fundamental contributions to the theory of the structure of algebraic and other classes of groups and in particular for the theory of buildings.
1994/95	Jürgen Moser	Switzerland; United States	for his fundamental work on stability in Hamiltonian mechanics and his profound and influential contributions to nonlinear differential equations.
1995/96	Robert Langlands	Canada	for his path-blazing work and extraordinary insight in the fields of number theory, automorphic forms and group representation.
1995/96	Andrew Wiles	United Kingdom	for spectacular contributions to number theory and related fields, major advances on fundamental conjectures, and for settling Fermat's Last Theorem.
1996/97	Joseph B. Keller	United States	for his profound and innovative contributions, in particular to electromagnetic, optical, and acoustic wave propagation and to fluid, solid, quantum and statistical mechanics.
1996/97	Yakov G. Sinai	Russia; United States	for his fundamental contributions to mathematically rigorous methods in statistical mechanics and the ergodic theory of dynamical systems and their applications in physics.
1998	No award		
1999	László Lovász	Hungary; United States	for his outstanding contributions to combinatorics, theoretical computer science and combinatorial optimization.
1999	Elias M. Stein	United States	for his contributions to classical and Euclidean Fourier analysis and for his exceptional impact on a new generation of analysts through his eloquent teaching and writing.
2000	Raoul Bott	Hungary; United States	for his deep discoveries in topology and differential geometry and their applications to Lie groups, differential operators and mathematical physics.
2000	Jean-Pierre Serre	France	for his many fundamental contributions to topology, algebraic geometry, algebra, and number theory and for his inspirational lectures and writing.
2001	Vladimir Arnold	Russia	for his deep and influential work in a multitude of areas of mathematics, including dynamical systems, differential equations, and singularity theory.
2001	Saharon Shelah	Israel	for his many fundamental contributions to mathematical logic and set theory, and their applications within other parts of mathematics.
2002/03	Mikio Sato	Japan	for his creation of algebraic analysis, including hyperfunction theory and microfunction theory, holonomic quantum field theory, and a unified theory of soliton equations.
2002/03	John Tate	United States	for his creation of fundamental concepts in algebraic number theory.
2004	No award		
2005	Gregory Margulis	Russia; United States	for his monumental contributions to algebra, in particular to the theory of lattices in semi-simple Lie groups, and striking applications of this to ergodic theory, representation theory, number theory, combinatorics, and measure theory.
2005	Sergei Novikov	Russia	for his fundamental and pioneering contributions to algebraic and differential topology, and to mathematical physics, notably the introduction of algebraic-geometric methods.
2006/07	Stephen Smale	United States	for his groundbreaking contributions that have played a fundamental role in shaping differential topology, dynamical systems, mathematical economics, and other subjects in mathematics.
2006/07	Hillel Furstenberg	United States; Israel	for his profound contributions to ergodic theory, probability, topological dynamics, analysis on symmetric spaces and homogeneous flows.
2008	Pierre Deligne	Belgium	for his work on mixed Hodge theory; the Weil conjectures; the Riemann-Hilbert correspondence; and for his contributions to arithmetic.
2008	Phillip A. Griffiths	United States	for his work on variations of Hodge structures; the theory of periods of abelian integrals; and for his contributions to complex differential geometry.
2008	David B. Mumford	United States	for his work on algebraic surfaces; on geometric invariant theory; and for laying the foundations of the modern algebraic theory of moduli of curves and theta functions.
2009	No award		
2010	Shing-Tung Yau	United States	for his work in geometric analysis that has had a profound and dramatic impact on many areas of geometry and physics.
2010	Dennis P. Sullivan	United States	for his innovative contributions to algebraic topology and conformal dynamics.
2011	No award		
2012	Michael Aschbacher	United States	for his work on the theory of finite groups.
2012	Luis Caffarelli	Argentina	for his work on partial differential equations.
2013	George D. Mostow	United States	for his fundamental and pioneering contribution to geometry and Lie group theory.
2013	Michael Artin	United States	for his fundamental contributions to algebraic geometry, both in commutative and noncommutative.
2014	Peter Sarnak	South Africa; United States	for his deep contributions in analysis, number theory, geometry, and combinatorics.
2015	James G. Arthur	Canada	for his monumental work on the trace formula and his fundamental contributions to the theory of automorphic representations of reductive groups.
2016	No award		
2017	Richard Schoen	United States	for his contributions to geometric analysis and the understanding of the interconnectedness of partial differential equations and differential geometry.
2017	Charles Fefferman	United States	for his contributions in a number of mathematical areas including complex multivariate analysis, partial differential equations and sub-elliptical problems.
2018	Alexander Beilinson	Russia; United States	for their work that has made significant progress at the interface of geometry and mathematical physics.
2018	Vladimir Drinfeld	Ukraine; United States	for their work that has made significant progress at the interface of geometry and mathematical physics.
2019	Jean-Francois Le Gall	France	for his several deep and elegant contributions to the theory of stochastic processes.
2019	Gregory Lawler	United States	for his comprehensive and pioneering research on erased loops and random walks.
2020	Simon K. Donaldson	United Kingdom	for their contributions to differential geometry and topology.
2020	Yakov Eliashberg	United States	for their contributions to differential geometry and topology.
2021	No award		
2022	George Lusztig	Romania; United States; Hungary	for his groundbreaking contributions to representation theory and related areas.
2023	Ingrid Daubechies	Belgium; United States	for her work in wavelet theory and applied harmonic analysis.
2024	Adi Shamir	Israel	for his fundamental contributions to Mathematical Cryptography.
2024	Noga Alon	Israel	for his fundamental contributions to Combinatorics and Theoretical Computer Science.
2025	No award		
2026	Joseph Bernstein	Israel	for foundational work on representation theory, automorphic forms and algebraic geometry, and their role in creating geometric representation theory.
2026	David Kazhdan	Israel	for foundational work on representation theory, automorphic forms and algebraic geometry, and their role in creating geometric representation theory.

== Laureates per country ==
Below is a chart of all laureates per country (updated to 2026 laureates). Some laureates are counted more than once if they have multiple citizenships.

Country	Number of laureates
United States	34
Soviet Union / Russia	10
France	7
Israel	7
Hungary	5
Japan	3
Belgium	3
Germany	2
United Kingdom	2
Canada	2
Argentina	2
Sweden	2
Ukraine	2
South Africa	1
Poland	1
Italy	1
China	1
Norway	1
Finland	1
Romania	1

== See also ==
- List of mathematics awards
