= Tetsuji Miwa =

Japanese mathematician (born 1949)

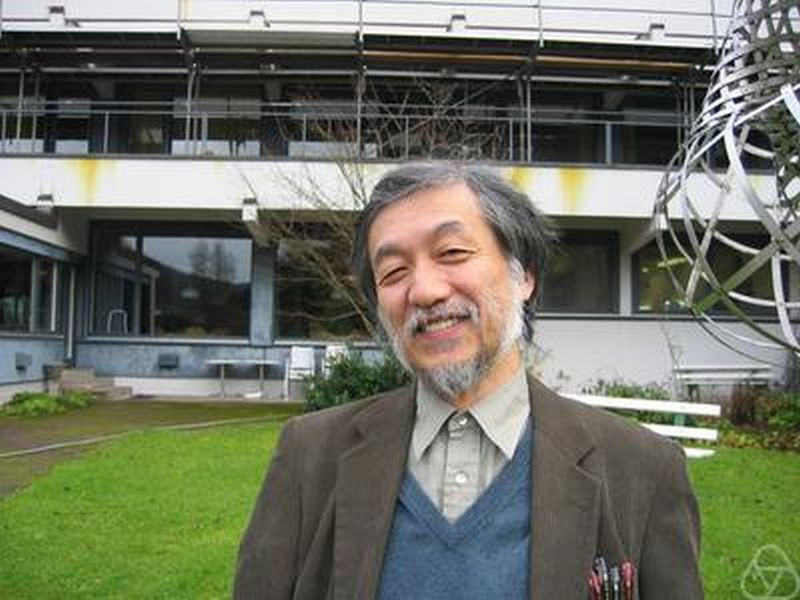
Tetsuji Miwa, Oberwolfach 2006

Tetsuji Miwa (三輪 哲二, Miwa Tetsuji; born 10 February 1949 in Tokyo) is a Japanese mathematician, specializing in mathematical physics.

== Career ==
Miwa received his undergraduate degree in 1971 and his master's degree in 1973 from the University of Tokyo. He studied microlocal analysis and hyperfunctions in the early 1970s under the influence of Mikio Satō and Masaki Kashiwara. In 1973 Miwa moved to RIMS (Research Institute for Mathematical Sciences) at Kyoto University and joined the mathematicians of the Satō school. He received his PhD in 1981 from Kyoto University. There he was a research assistant from 1973 to 1984, an associate professor from 1984 to 1993, and a full professor from 1993, retiring as professor emeritus in 2013. He held a joint appointment as a professor at RIMS.

== Research ==
With Michio Satō and Michio Jimbō he discovered in the 1970s a connection with monodromic-derived ( isomonodromes ) deformations of linear differential equations and correlation functions in the Ising model. With Jimbō he then examined general isomonodromic deformations of linear differential equations. (This mathematical approach to linear differential equations was begun during the early years of the 20th century by Ludwig Schlesinger.)

Miwa studied, with Jimbō and Etsuro Date, the role of affine Lie algebras in soliton equations and, with Jimbō, the role of quantum groups in exactly solvable grid models of statistical mechanics.

He collaborated with Mikio Sato and Michio Jimbo on the isomonodromic deformation theory and its application to the 2-dimensional Ising model. Dr. Miwa is widely recognized by his work on solitons and exactly solvable lattice models in connection with the representation theory of the affine Lie algebras, and on correlation functions of quantum spin chains in connection with the representation theory of the quantum affine algebras.

== Awards and honors ==
Miwa and Michio Jimbō were jointly awarded in 1987 the autumn prize of the Mathematical Society of Japan and in 1999 the Asahi Prize. In 2013 Miwa was awarded, jointly with Michio Jimbō, the Dannie Heineman Prize for Mathematical Physics for "profound developments in integrable systems and their correlation functions in statistical mechanics and quantum field theory, making use of quantum groups, algebraic analysis and deformation theory." He received the Weyl-Wigner Award in 2026.

In 1986 he was an Invited Speaker with talk Integrable lattice models and branching coefficients at the International Congress of Mathematicians (ICM) in Berkeley. In 1998 he gave a plenary lecture Solvable Lattice Models and Representation Theory of Quantum Affine Algebras at the ICM in Berlin.

== Selected publications ==
- as editor with Masaki Kashiwara: Physical Combinatorics. Birkhäuser 2000, ISBN 3-7643-4175-0 / ISBN 0-8176-4175-0
- with Michio Jimbō, Etsurō Date: Solitons: differential equations, symmetries and infinite dimensional algebras. Cambridge University Press 2000, ISBN 0-521-56161-2
- with Jimbō: Algebraic analysis of solvable lattice models. American Mathematical Society 1993, ISBN 0-8218-0320-4
- with Jimbō: Solitons and infinite dimensional Lie algebras. Publ. Res. Inst. Math. Sci., vol. 19, 1983, pp. 943–1001, doi:10.2977/prims/1195182017
- with H. Boos, M. Jimbo, F. Smirnov, and Y. Takeyama: Boos, H.; Jimbo, M.; Miwa, T.; Smirnov, F.; Takeyama, Y. (2006). "A recursion formula for the correlation functions of an inhomogeneous XXX model". St. Petersburg Mathematical Journal. 17: 85–117. arXiv:hep-th/0405044. doi:10.1090/S1061-0022-06-00894-6.
