= Pierre Schapira (mathematician) =

French mathematician

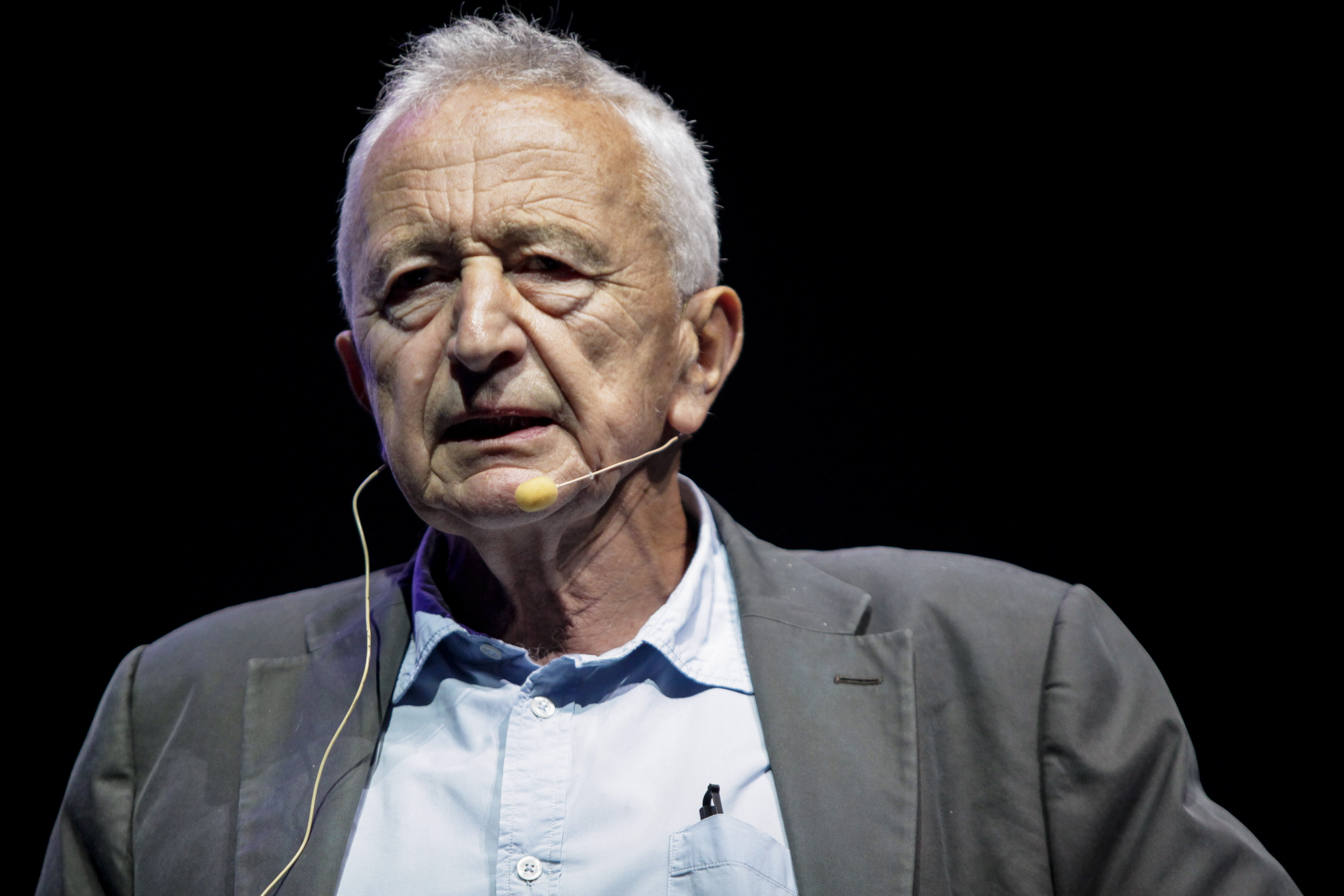
Pierre Schapira at the ICM 2018

Pierre Schapira (born April 28, 1943) is a French mathematician. He specializes in algebraic analysis, especially Mikio Sato's microlocal analysis, together with the mathematical concepts of sheaves and derived categories.

Schapira received his doctorate for work on hyperfunctions. Although these were already in use in France by André Martineau, they were further developed by Schapira and Jacques-Louis Lions. This work earned Shapira an invitation to Kyoto University, where he met Masaki Kashiwara. Together, they developed the microlocal theory of sheaves, and have co-authored many papers spanning several decades.

He served as a professor at the Paris 13 University in the 1980s and has been a professor at the Pierre and Marie Curie University since the 1990s.

In 1990, he was an invited speaker at the International Congress of Mathematicians in Kyoto, speaking on sheaf theory for partial differential equations.

Schapira was inducted as a fellow of the American Mathematical Society with the Society's inaugural class of Fellows in 2013.

== See also ==
- Mikio Sato
- Masaki Kashiwara
- Jean Leray
- Alexander Grothendieck
