= Bernstein–Sato polynomial =

Polynomial related to differential operators

In mathematics, the Bernstein–Sato polynomial is a polynomial related to differential operators, introduced independently by Joseph Bernstein (1971) and Mikio Sato and Takuro Shintani (1972, 1974), Sato (1990). It is also known as the b-function, the b-polynomial, and the Bernstein polynomial, though it is not related to the Bernstein polynomials used in approximation theory. It has applications to singularity theory, monodromy theory, and quantum field theory.

Severino Coutinho (1995) gives an elementary introduction, while Armand Borel (1987) and Masaki Kashiwara (2003) give more advanced accounts.

== Definition and properties ==
If $f(x)$ is a polynomial in several variables, then there are a non-zero polynomial $b(s)$ and a differential operator $P(s)$ with polynomial coefficients such that

$$P(s)f(x)^{s+1} = b(s)f(x)^s.$$

The Bernstein–Sato polynomial is the monic polynomial of smallest degree amongst such polynomials $b(s)$. Its existence can be shown using the notion of holonomic D-modules.

Kashiwara (1976) proved that all roots of the Bernstein–Sato polynomial are negative rational numbers.

The Bernstein–Sato polynomial can also be defined for products of powers of several polynomials. In this case it is a product of linear factors with rational coefficients.

Nero Budur, Mircea Mustață, and Morihiko Saito (2006) generalized the Bernstein–Sato polynomial to arbitrary varieties.

The Bernstein–Sato polynomial can be computed algorithmically. However, such computations are hard in general. There are implementations of related algorithms in computer algebra systems RISA/Asir, Macaulay2, and SINGULAR.

Daniel Andres, Viktor Levandovskyy, and Jorge Martín-Morales (2009) presented algorithms to compute the Bernstein–Sato polynomial of an affine variety together with an implementation in the computer algebra system SINGULAR. Christine Berkesch and Anton Leykin (2010) described some of the algorithms for computing Bernstein–Sato polynomials by computer.

== Examples ==
- If $f(x)=x_1^2+\cdots+x_n^2 \,$ then

$$\sum_{i=1}^n \partial_i^2 f(x)^{s+1} = 4(s+1)\left(s+\frac{n}{2}\right)f(x)^s$$

so the Bernstein–Sato polynomial is

$$b(s)=(s+1)\left(s+\frac{n}{2}\right).$$

- If $f(x)=x_1^{n_1}x_2^{n_2}\cdots x_r^{n_r}$ then

$$\prod_{j=1}^r\partial_{x_j}^{n_j}\quad f(x)^{s+1}
=\prod_{j=1}^r\prod_{i=1}^{n_j}(n_js+i)\quad f(x)^s$$

so

$$b(s)=\prod_{j=1}^r\prod_{i=1}^{n_j}\left(s+\frac{i}{n_j}\right).$$

- The Bernstein–Sato polynomial of x^{2} + y^{3} is

$$(s+1)\left(s+\frac{5}{6}\right)\left(s+\frac{7}{6}\right).$$

- If t_{ij} are n^{2} variables, then the Bernstein–Sato polynomial of det(t_{ij}) is given by

$$(s+1)(s+2)\cdots(s+n)$$

which follows from

$$\Omega(\det(t_{ij})^s) = s(s+1)\cdots(s+n-1)\det(t_{ij})^{s-1}$$

where Ω is Cayley's omega process, which in turn follows from the Capelli identity.

== Applications ==
- If $f(x)$ is a non-negative polynomial then $f(x)^s$, initially defined for s with non-negative real part, can be analytically continued to a meromorphic distribution-valued function of s by repeatedly using the functional equation

$$f(x)^s={1\over b(s)} P(s)f(x)^{s+1}.$$

It may have poles whenever b(s + n) is zero for a non-negative integer n.

- If f(x) is a polynomial, not identically zero, then it has an inverse g that is a distribution; (Note: Warning: The inverse is not unique in general, because if f has zeros then there are distributions whose product with f is zero, and adding one of these to an inverse of f is another inverse of f.) in other words, f g = 1 as distributions. If f(x) is non-negative the inverse can be constructed using the Bernstein–Sato polynomial by taking the constant term of the Laurent expansion of f(x)^{s} at s = −1. For arbitrary f(x) just take $\bar f(x)$ times the inverse of $\bar f(x)f(x).$
- The Malgrange–Ehrenpreis theorem states that every differential operator with constant coefficients has a Green's function. By taking Fourier transforms this follows from the fact that every polynomial has a distributional inverse, which is proved in the paragraph above.
- Pavel Etingof (1999) showed how to use the Bernstein polynomial to define dimensional regularization rigorously, in the massive Euclidean case.
- The Bernstein-Sato functional equation is used in computations of some of the more complex kinds of singular integrals occurring in quantum field theory. Such computations are needed for precision measurements in elementary particle physics as practiced for instance at CERN (see the papers citing). However, the most interesting cases require a simple generalization of the Bernstein-Sato functional equation to the product of two polynomials $(f_1(x))^{s_1}(f_2(x))^{s_2}$, with x having 2-6 scalar components, and the pair of polynomials having orders 2 and 3. Unfortunately, a brute force determination of the corresponding differential operators $P(s_1,s_2)$ and $b(s_1,s_2)$ for such cases has so far proved prohibitively cumbersome. Devising ways to bypass the combinatorial explosion of the brute force algorithm would be of great value in such applications.
