= Wave front set =

Type of singularity analysis

In mathematical analysis, more precisely in microlocal analysis, the wave front (set) WF(f) characterizes the singularities of a generalized function f, not only in space, but also with respect to its Fourier transform at each point. The term "wave front" was coined by Lars Hörmander around 1970.

== Introduction ==
In more familiar terms, WF(f) tells not only where the function f is singular (which is already described by its singular support), but also how or why it is singular, by being more exact about the direction in which the singularity occurs. This concept is mostly useful in dimensions at least two, since in one dimension there are only two possible directions. The complementary notion of a function being non-singular in a direction is microlocal smoothness.

Intuitively, as an example, consider a function ƒ whose singular support is concentrated on a smooth curve in the plane at which the function has a jump discontinuity. In the direction tangent to the curve, the function remains smooth. By contrast, in the direction normal to the curve, the function has a singularity. To decide on whether the function is smooth in another direction v, one can try to smooth the function out by averaging in directions perpendicular to v. If the resulting function is smooth, then we regard ƒ to be smooth in the direction of v. Otherwise, v is in the wavefront set.

Formally, in Euclidean space, the wave front set of ƒ is defined as the complement of the set of all pairs (x_{0},v) such that there exists a test function $\phi\in C_c^\infty$ with $\phi$(x_{0}) ≠ 0 and an open cone Γ containing v such that the estimate

$$|(\phi f)^\wedge(\xi)| \le C_N(1+|\xi|)^{-N}\quad\mbox{for all }\ \xi\in\Gamma$$

holds for all positive integers N. Here $(\phi f)^\wedge$ denotes the Fourier transform. Observe that the wavefront set is conical in the sense that if (x,v) ∈ Wf(ƒ), then (x,λv) ∈ Wf(ƒ) for all λ > 0. In the example discussed in the previous paragraph, the wavefront set is the set-theoretic complement of the image of the tangent bundle of the curve inside the tangent bundle of the plane.

Because the definition involves cutoff by a compactly supported function, the notion of a wave front set can be transported to any differentiable manifold X. In this more general situation, the wave front set is a closed conical subset of the cotangent bundle T^{*}(X), since the ξ variable naturally localizes to a covector rather than a vector. The wave front set is defined such that its projection on X is equal to the singular support of the function.

== Definition ==
In Euclidean space, the wave front set of a distribution ƒ is defined as

$${\rm WF}(f) = \{ (x,\xi)\in \mathbb{R}^n\times\mathbb{R}^n \mid \xi\in\Sigma_x(f)\}$$

where $\Sigma_x(f)$ is the singular fibre of ƒ at x. The singular fibre is defined to be the complement of all directions $\xi$ such that the Fourier transform of f, localized at x, is sufficiently regular when restricted to an open cone containing $\xi$. More precisely, a direction v is in the complement of $\Sigma_x(f)$ if there is a compactly supported smooth function $\phi$ with $\phi$(x)$\not= 0$ and an open cone $\Gamma$ containing v such that the following estimate holds for each positive integer N:

$$|(\phi f)^\wedge(\xi)| < c_N(1+|\xi|)^{-N}\quad{\rm for~all}\ \xi\in\Gamma.$$

Once such an estimate holds for a particular cutoff function $\phi$ at x, it also holds for all cutoff functions with smaller support, possibly for a different open cone containing v.

On a differentiable manifold M, using local coordinates $x,\xi$ on the cotangent bundle, the wave front set WF(f) of a distribution ƒ can be defined in the following general way:

$${\rm WF}(f) = \{ (x,\xi)\in T^*(X) \mid \xi\in\Sigma_x(f) \}$$

where the singular fibre $\Sigma_x(f)$ is again the complement of all directions $\xi$ such that the Fourier transform of f, localized at x, is sufficiently regular when restricted to a conical neighbourhood of $\xi$. The problem of regularity is local, so it can be checked in the local coordinate system, using the Fourier transform on the x variables. The required regularity estimate transforms well under diffeomorphism, and so the notion of regularity is independent of the choice of local coordinates.

=== Generalizations ===
The notion of a wave front set can be adapted to accommodate other notions of regularity of a function. Localized can here be expressed by saying that f is truncated by some smooth cutoff function not vanishing at x. (The localization process could be done in a more elegant fashion, using germs.)

More concretely, this can be expressed as

$$\xi\notin\Sigma_x(f) \iff  \xi=0 \text{ or }\exists\phi\in\mathcal D_x,\ \exists V\in\mathcal V_\xi: \widehat{\phi f}|_V\in O(V)$$

where

- $\mathcal D_x$ are compactly supported smooth functions not vanishing at x,
- $\mathcal V_\xi$ are conical neighbourhoods of $\xi$, i.e. neighbourhoods V such that $c\cdot V\subset V$ for all $c > 0$,
- $\widehat u|_V$ denotes the Fourier transform of the (compactly supported generalized) function u, restricted to V,
- $O: \Omega\to O(\Omega)$ is a fixed presheaf of functions (or distributions) whose choice enforces the desired regularity of the Fourier transform.

Typically, sections of O are required to satisfy some growth (or decrease) condition at infinity, e.g. such that $(1+|\xi|)^s v(\xi)$ belong to some L^{p} space. This definition makes sense, because the Fourier transform becomes more regular (in terms of growth at infinity) when f is truncated with the smooth cutoff $\phi$.

The most difficult "problem", from a theoretical point of view, is finding the adequate sheaf O characterizing functions belonging to a given subsheaf E of the space G of generalized functions.

=== Example ===
If we take G = D′ the space of Schwartz distributions and want to characterize distributions which are locally $C^\infty$ functions, we must take for O(Ω) the classical function spaces called O′_{M}(Ω) in the literature.

Then the projection on the first component of a distribution's wave front set is nothing else than its classical singular support, i.e. the complement of the set on which its restriction would be a smooth function.

=== Applications ===
The wave front set is useful, among others, when studying propagation of singularities by pseudodifferential operators. The propagation of singularities theorem characterizes the wave front set.

== See also ==
- FBI transform
- Singular spectrum
- Essential support
