= Characteristic variety =

In mathematical analysis, the characteristic variety of a microdifferential operator P is an algebraic variety that is the zero set of the principal symbol of P in the cotangent bundle. It is invariant under a quantized contact transformation.

The notion is also defined more generally in commutative algebra. A basic theorem says a characteristic variety is involutive.
