= International Colloquium on Group Theoretical Methods in Physics =

- Abbreviation: ICGTMP
- Discipline: Mathematical physics

Publication details
- Publisher: Various
- History: 1972–present
- Frequency: Annual (1972–1988), Biennial (since 1988)

The International Colloquium on Group Theoretical Methods in Physics (ICGTMP) is an academic conference devoted to applications of group theory to physics. It was founded in 1972 by Henri Bacry and Aloysio Janner. It hosts a colloquium every two years. The ICGTMP is led by a Standing Committee, which helps select winners for the three major awards presented at the conference: the Wigner Medal (1978–2018), the Hermann Weyl Prize (since 2002) and the Weyl–Wigner Award (since 2022).

== Wigner Medal ==
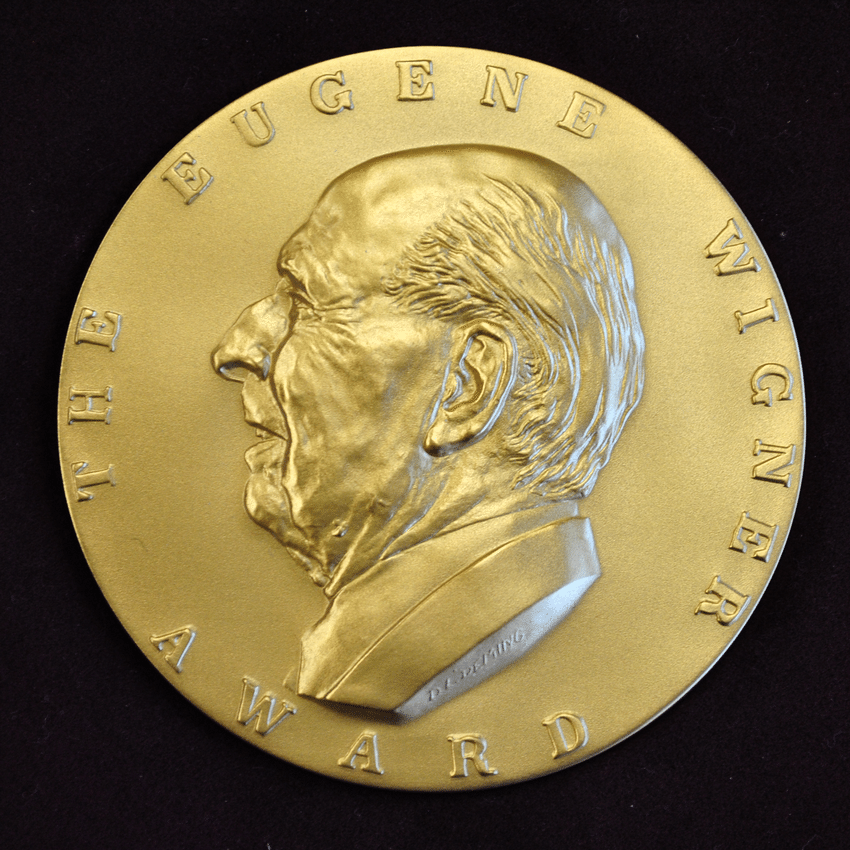
The Wigner Medal

The Wigner Medal was an award designed "to recognize outstanding contributions to the understanding of physics through Group Theory". It was administered by The Group Theory and Fundamental Physics Foundation, a publicly supported organization. The first award was given in 1978 to Eugene Wigner at the Integrative Conference on Group Theory and Mathematical Physics.

The collaboration between the Standing Committee of the ICGTMP and the Foundation ended in 2020.

The Standing Committee does not recognize the post-2018 Wigner Medals awarded by the Foundation as the continuation of the prize from 1978 through 2018.

== Weyl–Wigner Award ==
In 2020–21, the ICGTMP Standing Committee created a new prize to replace the Wigner Medal, called the Weyl–Wigner Award. The purpose of the Weyl–Wigner Award is "to recognize outstanding contributions to the understanding of physics through group theory, continuing the tradition of The Wigner Medal that was awarded at the International Colloquium on Group Theoretical Methods in Physics from 1978 to 2018." The recipients of this prize are chosen by an international selection committee elected by the Standing Committee.

The first Weyl–Wigner Award was awarded in Strasbourg in July 2022 during the ICGTMP Group34 Colloquium to Nicolai Reshetikhin.

== Hermann Weyl Prize ==
The Hermann Weyl Prize was established to award young scientists "who have performed original work of significant scientific quality in the area of understanding physics through symmetries".

Heinz-Dietrich Doebner convinced the Standing Committee that it would be necessary for the future development of the field to acknowledge young researchers who presented outstanding work and to motivate them, to continue and to diversify their activity. He proposed to award in each Colloquium a Prize. Ivan Todorov suggested to name this Prize after the mathematician and physicist Hermann Weyl. The first Weyl Prize was awarded in 2002 to Edward Frenkel.

== List of conferences ==
Number	Year	Location	Wigner Medal awardees	Proceedings
1st	1972	Marseille	-	
2nd	1973	Nijmegen	-	University of Nijmegen
3rd	1974	Marseille	-	University of Nijmegen
4th	1975	Nijmegen	-	Springer
5th	1976	Montreal	-	Academic Press
6th	1977	Tübingen	-	Springer
7th	1978	Austin, Texas	Eugene Wigner and Valentine Bargmann	Springer
8th	1979	Kiryat Anavim	-	Adam Hilger (Bristol, UK)
9th	1980	Cocoyoc	Israel Gel'fand	Springer
10th	1981	Canterbury	-	
11th	1982	Istanbul	Louis Michel	Springer
12th	1983	Trieste	-	Springer
13th	1984	Maryland	Yuval Ne'eman	World Scientific (Singapore)
14th	1985	Seoul	-	
15th	1986	Philadelphia	Feza Gürsey	
16th	1987	Varna	-	Springer
17th	1988	Montreal	Isadore Singer	
18th	1990	Moscow	Francesco Iachello	Springer
19th	1992	Salamanca	Julius Wess and Bruno Zumino	
20th	1994	Toyonaka	-	World Scientific
21st	1996	Goslar	Victor Kac and Robert Moody	
22nd	1998	Hobart	Marcos Moshinsky	
23rd	2000	Dubna	Lochlainn O'Raifeartaigh	
24th	2002	Paris	Harry Jeannot Lipkin	CRC Press
25th	2004	Cocoyoc	Erdal İnönü	CRC Press
26th	2006	New York	Susumu Okubo	
27th	2008	Yerevan	-	
28th	2010	Newcastle upon Tyne	Michio Jimbo	IOP
29th	2012	Tianjin	C. Alden Mead	World Scientific
30th	2014	Ghent	Joshua Zak	IOP
31st	2016	Rio de Janeiro	Bertram Kostant	Springer
32nd	2018	Prague	Pavel Winternitz	IOP
33rd	2020	Cotonou, cancelled by COVID-19		
			Weyl–Wigner Award awardees	
34th	2022	Strasbourg	Nicolai Reshetikhin	SciPost
33rd/35th	2024	Cotonou	Igor Frenkel and Michèle Vergne	
36th	2026	Valladolid	Boris Feigin and Tetsuji Miwa	

== See also ==
- List of physics awards
- List of prizes named after people
