= Takahiro Kawai =

Japanese mathematician

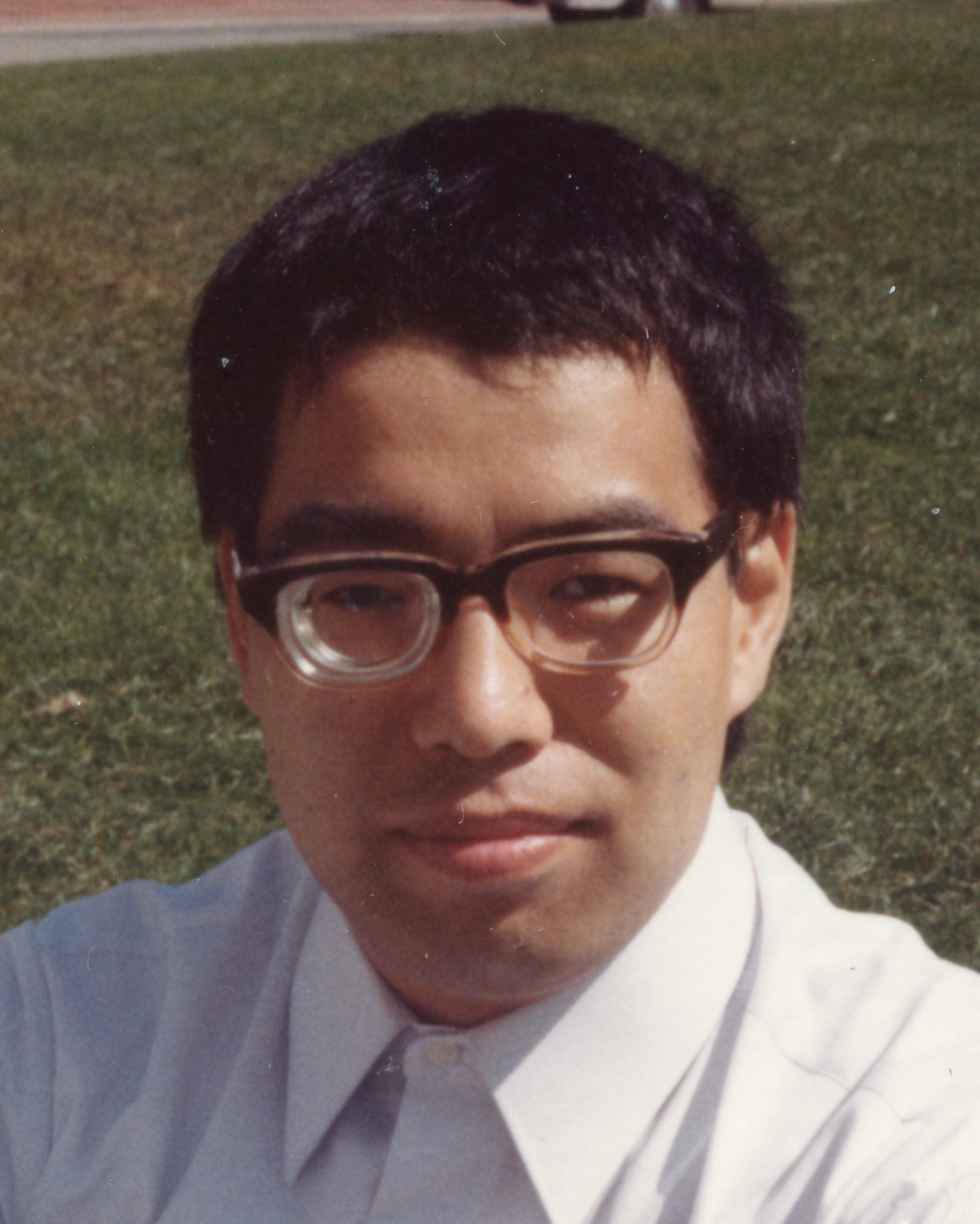
- Born: 1945 (age 80–81); Tsushima, Aichi, Japan
- Education: RIMS (Ph.D., 1973)
- Awards: Asahi Prize (1987)
- Scientific career
- Fields: Mathematics
- Workplaces: RIMS
- Doctoral advisor: Mikio Sato

Takahiro Kawai (河合 隆裕, Kawai Takahiro; born 1945, Tsushima, Aichi) is a Japanese mathematician working on algebraic analysis. He is a professor emeritus at RIMS. He was a student of Mikio Sato at the same time as Masaki Kashiwara with whom he later shared the Asahi Prize in 1987.
