= Malgrange–Ehrenpreis theorem =

A key question in mathematics and physics is how to model empty space with a point source, like the effect of a point mass on the gravitational potential energy, or a point heat source on a plate. Such physical phenomena are modeled by partial differential equations, having the form $L\phi = \delta$, where $L$ is a linear differential operator and $\delta$ is a delta function representing the point source. A solution to this problem (with suitable boundary conditions) is called a Green's function.

This motivates the question: given a linear differential operator $L$ (with constant coefficients), can we always solve $L\phi=\delta$? The Malgrange–Ehrenpreis theorem answers this in the affirmative. It states that every non-zero linear differential operator with constant coefficients has a Green's function. It was first proved independently by Leon Ehrenpreis (1954, 1955) and Bernard Malgrange (1955–1956).

This means that the differential equation

$$P\left(\frac{\partial}{\partial x_1}, \ldots,  \frac{\partial}{\partial x_\ell} \right) u(\mathbf{x}) = \delta(\mathbf{x}),$$

where $P$ is a polynomial in several variables and $\delta$ is the Dirac delta function, has a distributional solution $u$. It can be used to show that

$$P\left(\frac{\partial}{\partial x_1}, \ldots,  \frac{\partial}{\partial x_\ell} \right) u(\mathbf{x}) = f(\mathbf{x})$$

has a solution for any compactly supported distribution $f$. The solution is not unique in general.

The analogue for differential operators whose coefficients are polynomials (rather than constants) is false: see Lewy's example.

== Proofs ==
The original proofs of Malgrange and Ehrenpreis did not use explicit constructions as they used the Hahn–Banach theorem. Since then several constructive proofs have been found.

There is a very short proof using the Fourier transform and the Bernstein–Sato polynomial, as follows. By taking Fourier transforms the Malgrange–Ehrenpreis theorem is equivalent to the fact that every non-zero polynomial $P$ has a distributional inverse. By replacing $P$ by the product with its complex conjugate, one can also assume that $P$ is non-negative. For non-negative polynomials $P$ the existence of a distributional inverse follows from the existence of the Bernstein–Sato polynomial, which implies that $P^s$ can be analytically continued as a meromorphic distribution-valued function of the complex variable $s$; the constant term of the Laurent expansion of $P^s$ at $s=-1$ is then a distributional inverse of $P$.

Other proofs, often giving better bounds on the growth of a solution, are given in (Hörmander 1983a, Theorem 7.3.10), (Reed & Simon 1975, Theorem IX.23, p. 48) and (Rosay 1991). (Hörmander 1983b, chapter 10) gives a detailed discussion of the regularity properties of the fundamental solutions.

A short constructive proof was presented in (Wagner 2009, Proposition 1, p. 458):

$$E=\frac{1}{\overline{P_m(2\eta)}} \sum_{j=0}^m a_j e^{\lambda_j\eta x} \mathcal{F}^{-1}_{\xi}\left(\frac{\overline{P(i\xi+\lambda_j\eta)}}{P(i \xi + \lambda_j \eta)}\right)$$

is a fundamental solution of $P(\partial)$, i.e., $P(\partial)E=\delta$, if $P_m$ is the principal part of $P$, $\eta\in\mathbb{R}^n$ with $P_m(\eta)\neq 0$, the real numbers $\lambda_0,\ldots,\lambda_m$ are pairwise different, and

$$a_j=\prod_{k=0,k\neq j}^m(\lambda_j-\lambda_k)^{-1}.$$
