= Beilinson–Bernstein localization =

In mathematics, especially in representation theory and algebraic geometry, the Beilinson–Bernstein localization theorem relates D-modules on flag varieties G/B to representations of the Lie algebra $\mathfrak g$ attached to a reductive group G. It was introduced by Beilinson & Bernstein (1981).

Extensions of this theorem include the case of partial flag varieties G/P, where P is a parabolic subgroup in Holland & Polo (1996) and a theorem relating D-modules on the affine Grassmannian to representations of the Kac–Moody algebra $\widehat \mathfrak g$ in Frenkel & Gaitsgory (2009).

== Statement ==
Let G be a reductive group over the complex numbers, and B a Borel subgroup. Then there is an equivalence of categories

$$\mathcal{D}\text{-Mod}(G/B)\ \simeq\ \left(U(\mathfrak{g})/\ker\chi\right) \text{-Mod}.$$

On the left is the category of D-modules on G/B. On the right χ is a homomorphism χ : Z(U(g)) → C from the centre of the universal enveloping algebra,

$$Z(U(\mathfrak{g}))\ \simeq\ \text{Sym}(\mathfrak{t})^{W,\rho},$$

corresponding to the weight -ρ ∈ t^{*} given by minus half the sum over the positive roots of g. The above action of W on t^{*} = Spec Sym(t) is shifted so as to fix -ρ.

=== Twisted version ===
There is an equivalence of categories

$$\mathcal{D}_\lambda\text{-Mod}(G/B)\ \simeq\ \left(U(\mathfrak{g})/\ker\chi_\lambda\right) \text{-Mod}.$$

for any λ ∈ t^{*} such that λ-ρ does not pair with any positive root α to give a nonpositive integer (it is "regular dominant"):

$$(\lambda-\rho, \alpha)\ \in\ \mathbf{C}-\mathbf{Z}_{\le 0}.$$

Here χ is the central character corresponding to λ-ρ, and D_{λ} is the sheaf of rings on G/B formed by taking the *-pushforward of D_{G/U} along the T-bundle G/U → G/B, a sheaf of rings whose center is the constant sheaf of algebras U(t), and taking the quotient by the central character determined by λ (not λ-ρ).

== Example: SL_{2} ==
The Lie algebra of vector fields on the projective line P^{1} is identified with sl_{2}, and

$$U(\mathfrak{sl}_2)/\Omega\ \simeq \ \mathcal{D}(\mathbf{P}^1)$$

via

$$(e,h,f) \ \mapsto \ (\partial_z, -2z\partial_z, z^2\partial_z)$$

It can be checked linear combinations of three vector fields C ⊂ P^{1} are the only vector fields extending to ∞ ∈ P^{1}. Here,

$$\Omega\ =\ ef+fe+\frac{1}{2}h^2$$

is sent to zero.

The only finite dimensional sl_{2} representation on which Ω acts by zero is the trivial representation k, which is sent to the constant sheaf, i.e. the ring of functions O ∈ D-Mod. The Verma module of weight 0 is sent to the D-Module δ supported at 0 ∈ P^{1}.

Each finite dimensional representation corresponds to a different twist.
