= Theta operator =

Mathematical operator

In mathematics, the theta operator is a differential operator defined by

$$\theta = z {d \over dz}.$$

This is sometimes also called the homogeneity operator, because its eigenfunctions are the monomials in z:

$$\theta (z^k) = k z^k,\quad k=0,1,2,\dots$$

In n variables the homogeneity operator is given by

$$\theta = \sum_{k=1}^n x_k \frac{\partial}{\partial x_k}.$$

As in one variable, the eigenspaces of θ are the spaces of homogeneous functions. (Euler's homogeneous function theorem)

== See also ==
- Difference operator
- Delta operator
- Elliptic operator
- Fractional calculus
- Invariant differential operator
- Differential calculus over commutative algebras
