= Asahi Prize =

- Awarded for: Achievement in science or arts that has made a great contribution to culture or society
- Country: Japan
- Presented by: Asahi shimbun and Asahi Shimbun Foundation
- First award: 1929
- Website: www.asahi.com/corporate/award/asahi/12737983

The Asahi Prize (朝日賞, Asahi Shō), established in 1929, is an award presented by the Japanese newspaper Asahi Shimbun and Asahi Shimbun Foundation to honor individuals and groups that have made outstanding accomplishments in the fields of arts and academics and have greatly contributed to the development and progress of Japanese culture and society at large.

The Asahi Prize was created to celebrate the 50th anniversary of the foundation of Asahi Shimbun. It is recognized today as one of the most authoritative private awards.

The award recipients are announced each year in The Asahi Shimbun on New Year's Day.

== Asahi Sports Award ==
In its early years the awards were divided into three categories: "Culture," "Welfare," and "Sports." In 1975 the "Asahi Prize" was made a comprehensive award, and the Welfare category was separated into the "Asahi Social Welfare Award" and the Sports category into the "Asahi Sports Award".

== Notable winners ==
Past prize winners include the following.

=== Arts ===
- Tsubouchi Shōyō, novelist, 1929
- Taikan Yokoyama, artist, 1933
- Jigoro Kano, founder of judo, 1935
- Shimazaki Toson, novelist, 1935
- Ryōhei Koiso, painter, 1939
- Jun'ichirō Tanizaki, novelist, 1948
- NHK Symphony Orchestra, 1951
- Mashiho Chiri, 1954
- Eiji Yoshikawa, novelist, 1955
- Shikō Munakata, artist, 1964
- Jirō Osaragi, writer, 1964
- Akira Kurosawa, film director, 1965
- Haruko Sugimura, actress, 1968
- Ryōtarō Shiba, novelist, 1982
- Ineko Sata, writer, 1983
- Yasushi Inoue, novelist, 1984
- Seiji Ozawa, conductor, 1985
- Osamu Tezuka, manga artist, 1987
- Arata Isozaki, architect, 1988 (2019 Pritzker Architecture Prize)
- Migishi Setsuko, artist, 1989
- Seichō Matsumoto, novelist, 1989
- Shuhei Fujisawa, novelist, 1993
- Fumihiko Maki, architect, 1993 (1993 Pritzker Architecture Prize)
- Tadao Ando, architect, 1994 (1995 Pritzker Architecture Prize)
- Kenzaburō Ōe, novelist, 1994 (1994 Nobel Prize in Literature)
- Shuntaro Tanikawa, poet, 1995 (2022 Struga Poetry Evenings Golden Wreath Award)
- Yoji Yamada, film director, 1996
- Donald Keene, writer, 1997
- Makoto Ōoka, poet, 1997 (1996 Struga Poetry Evenings Golden Wreath Award)
- Yayoi Kusama, artist, 2000
- Hayao Miyazaki, film director, 2001 (2002 Academy Award for Best Animated Feature)
- Ai Nagai, playwright, 2005
- Haruki Murakami, novelist, 2006 (2009 Jerusalem Prize)
- Shigeru Mizuki, manga artist, 2008
- Tadanori Yokoo, artist, 2011
- Takarazuka Revue, 2013
- Tatsuya Nakadai, actor, 2013
- Taichi Yamada, screenwriter, 2014
- Shigeru Ban, architect, 2015 (2014 Pritzker Architecture Prize)
- Tōta Kaneko, poet 2015
- Kazushi Ono, conductor 2015
- Moto Hagio, manga artist, 2016
- Jakucho Setouchi novelist, 2017
- Yoko Tawada, writer, 2019
- Haruomi Hosono. bass player, 2020
- Daidō Moriyama, photographer, 2020
- Machi Tawara, poet, 2021
- Miyako Ishiuchi, photographer, 2022
- Kojin Karatani, philosopher and critic, 2022 (2022 Berggruen Prize for Philosophy and Culture)
- Nobuko Imai, violist, 2024
- Hiroyuki Sanada, actor, 2024
- Kazuyo Sejima, architect, 2025 (2010 Pritzker Architecture Prize)

=== Science ===
- Yoshio Nishina, physicist, 1944
- Shinichiro Tomonaga, physicist, 1946 (1965 Nobel Prize in Physics)
- Shoichi Sakata, physicist, 1948
- Tomizo Yoshida, pathologist, 1951 (1963 Robert Koch Prize)
- Kiyoshi Oka, mathematician, 1953
- Hamao Umezawa, scientist, 1958
- Leo Esaki, physicist, 1959 (1973 Nobel Prize in Physics)
- Kenkichi Iwasawa, mathematician, 1959 (1962 Cole Prize)
- Osamu Hayaishi, biochemist, 1964 (1986 Wolf Prize in Medicine)
- Yoshimasa Hirata, chemist, 1965
- Chushiro Hayashi, astrophysicist, 1965 (2004 Bruce Medal)
- Heisuke Hironaka, mathematician, 1967 (1970 Fields Medal)
- Setsuro Ebashi, biomedical scientist, 1968 (1979 Croonian Medal)
- Mikio Sato, mathematician, 1969 (2003 Wolf Prize in Mathematics)
- Reiji Okazaki, molecular biologist, 1970
- Kimishige Ishizaka, immunologist, 1973 (1973 Canada Gairdner International Award)
- Kiyoshi Itô, mathematician, 1977 (1987 Wolf Prize in Mathematics)
- Susumu Tonegawa, molecular biologist, 1981 (1987 Nobel Prize in Physiology or Medicine)
- Tasuku Honjo, immunologist, 1981 (2018 Nobel Prize in Physiology or Medicine)
- Hidesaburo Hanafusa, virologist, 1983 (1982 Albert Lasker Award for Basic Medical Research)
- Masaki Watanabe, orthopedic surgeon, 1983
- Jun-ichi Nishizawa, engineer, 1984 (2000 IEEE Edison Medal)
- Yasutomi Nishizuka, biochemist, 1985 (1994 Wolf Prize in Medicine)
- Motoo Kimura, biologist, 1986 (1992 Darwin Medal)
- Akira Tonomura, physicist, 1986 (1999 Benjamin Franklin Medal)
- Kamiokande Project Team (Leader: Masatoshi Koshiba), 1987 (2002 Nobel Prize in Physics)
- Masaki Kashiwara (2025 Abel Prize) / Takahiro Kawai, mathematician, 1987
- Hirotsugu Akaike, statistician, 1988
- Tadamitsu Kishimoto, immunologist, 1988 (2009 Crafoord Prize)
- Tadatsugu Taniguchi, immunologist, 1988 (1991 Robert Koch Prize)
- Tomisaku Kawasaki, pediatrician, 1989
- Masato Sagawa, Metallurgist, 1990 (2022 Queen Elizabeth Prize for Engineering)
- Goro Shimura, mathematician, 1991 (1977 Cole Prize)
- Ryoji Noyori, chemist, 1992 (2001 Nobel Prize in Chemistry)
- Masatoshi Takeichi, biologist, 1993 (2020 Canada Gairdner International Award)
- Makoto Kobayashi, physicist, 1994 (2008 Nobel Prize in Physics)
- Toshihide Masukawa, physicist, 1994 (2008 Nobel Prize in Physics)
- Nobutaka Hirokawa, neuroscientist, 1995
- Syukuro Manabe, meteorologist, 1995 (2021 Nobel Prize in Physics)
- Sumio Iijima, physicist, 1996 (2002 Benjamin Franklin Medal)
- Shigekazu Nagata, molecular biologist, 1997(1995 Robert Koch Prize)
- Super Kamiokande Project Team (Leader: Yoji Totsuka,), 1998 (2007 Benjamin Franklin Medal)
- Toshio Yanagida, biophysicist, 1998
- Seiji Ogawa, physicist, 1999 (2003 Canada Gairdner International Award)
- Shuji Nakamura, material scientist, 2000 (2014 Nobel Prize in Physics)
- Isamu Akasaki, material scientist, 2000 (2014 Nobel Prize in Physics)
- Shizuo Akira, immunologist, 2005 (2011 Canada Gairdner International Award)
- Takao Kondo, biologist, 2006
- Osamu Shimomura, chemist, 2006 (2008 Nobel Prize in Chemistry)
- Shinya Yamanaka, biomedical scientist, 2007 (2012 Nobel Prize in Physiology or Medicine)
- Yoshinori Ohsumi, biologist, 2008 (2016 Nobel Prize in Physiology or Medicine)
- Hayabusa Mission (Japan Aerospace Exploration Agency), 2010
- Shimon Sakaguchi, immunologist, 2011 (2025 Nobel Prize in Physiology or Medicine)
- Hiroyuki Matsunami, engineer, 2012 (2023 IEEE Edison Medal)
- Kenji Kosaka, psychiatrist, 2013
- Kazutoshi Mori, molecular biologist, 2013 (2014 Albert Lasker Award for Basic Medical Research)
- Hiroaki Mitsuya, virologist, 2014
- Satoshi Ōmura, biochemist, 2014 (2015 Nobel Prize in Physiology or Medicine)
- Hiraku Nakajima, mathematician, 2016 (2003 Cole Prize)
- Jaw-Shen Tsai, Taiwanese physicist, 2020
- Takurō Mochizuki, mathematician, 2020 (2022 Breakthrough Prize in Mathematics)
- Keiko Torii, plant scientist, 2021
- Makoto Fujita, chemist, 2022 (2020 Wolf Prize in Chemistry)
- Tsutomu Miyasaka, chemist, 2023
- Yoshiko Ogata, mathematical physicist, 2024
- Takashi Taniguchi, material engineer, 2024
- Kenji Watanabe, material engineer, 2024
- Masahiro Hara, engineer, 2025
