= Mikio Sato =

Japanese mathematician (1928–2023)

- Born: 18 April 1928; Tokyo, Empire of Japan
- Died: 9 January 2023 (aged 94); Kyoto, Japan
- Education: University of Tokyo (BSc, 1952; PhD, 1963)
- Known for: Bernstein–Sato polynomials; Sato–Tate conjecture; Algebraic analysis; Holonomic quantum field; Hyperfunction; Prehomogeneous vector space
- Awards: Asahi Prize of Science (1969); Japan Academy Prize (1976); Person of Cultural Merits (1984); Rolf Schock Prize in Mathematics (1997); Wolf Prize (2003)
- Scientific career
- Fields: Mathematics
- Workplaces: Kyoto University; University of Tokyo; Osaka University
- Thesis: Theory of hyperfunctions (1963)
- Doctoral advisor: Shokichi Iyanaga
- Doctoral students: Michio Jimbo; Masaki Kashiwara; Takahiro Kawai; Tetsuji Miwa

Mikio Sato (Japanese: 佐藤 幹夫, Hepburn: Satō Mikio; 18 April 1928 – 9 January 2023) was a Japanese mathematician known for founding the fields of algebraic analysis, hyperfunctions, and holonomic quantum fields. He was a professor at the Research Institute for Mathematical Sciences in Kyoto.

== Biography ==
Born in Tokyo on 18 April 1928, Sato studied at the University of Tokyo, receiving his BSc in 1952 and PhD under Shokichi Iyanaga in 1963. He was a professor at Osaka University and the University of Tokyo before moving to the Research Institute for Mathematical Sciences (RIMS) attached to Kyoto University in 1970. He was director of RIMS from 1987 to 1991.

His disciples include Masaki Kashiwara, Takahiro Kawai, Tetsuji Miwa, as well as Michio Jimbo, who have been called the "Sato School".

Sato died at home in Kyoto on 9 January 2023, aged 94.

== Research ==
Sato was known for his innovative work in a number of fields, such as prehomogeneous vector spaces and Bernstein–Sato polynomials; and particularly for his hyperfunction theory. This theory initially appeared as an extension of the ideas of distribution theory; it was soon connected to the local cohomology theory of Grothendieck, for which it was an independent realisation in terms of sheaf theory. Further, it led to the theory of microfunctions and microlocal analysis in linear partial differential equations and Fourier theory, such as for wave fronts, and ultimately to the current developments in D-module theory. Part of Sato's hyperfunction theory is the modern theory of holonomic systems: PDEs overdetermined to the point of having finite-dimensional spaces of solutions (algebraic analysis).

In theoretical physics, Sato wrote a series of papers in the 1970s with Michio Jimbo and Tetsuji Miwa that developed the theory of holonomic quantum fields. When Sato was awarded the 2002–2003 Wolf Prize in Mathematics, this work was described as "a far-reaching extension of the mathematical formalism underlying the two-dimensional Ising model, and introduced along the way the famous tau functions." Sato also contributed basic work to non-linear soliton theory, with the use of Grassmannians of infinite dimension.

In number theory, he and John Tate independently posed the Sato–Tate conjecture on L-functions around 1960.

Pierre Schapira remarked, "Looking back, 40 years later, we realize that Sato's approach to mathematics is not so different from that of Grothendieck, that Sato did have the incredible temerity to treat analysis as algebraic geometry and was also able to build the algebraic and geometric tools adapted to his problems."

== Awards and honours ==
Sato received the 1969 Asahi Prize of Science, the 1976 Japan Academy Prize, the 1984 Person of Cultural Merits award of the Japanese Education Ministry, the 1997 Schock Prize, and the 2002–2003 Wolf Prize in Mathematics.

Sato was a plenary speaker at the 1983 International Congress of Mathematicians in Warsaw. He was elected a foreign member of the National Academy of Sciences in 1993.
