= Microdifferential operator =

In mathematics, a microdifferential operator is a linear operator on a cotangent bundle (phase space) that generalizes a differential operator and appears in the framework of microlocal analysis as well as in the Kyoto school of algebraic analysis.

The notion was originally introduced by L. Boutet de Monvel and P. Krée as well as by M. Sato, T. Kawai and M. Kashiwara. There is also an approach due to J. Sjöstrand.

== Definition ==
We first define the sheaf $\widehat{\mathcal{E}}$ of formal microdifferential operators on the cotangent bundle $T^* X$ of an open subset $X \subset \mathbb{C}^n$. A section of that sheaf over an open subset $U \subset T^* X$ is a formal series: for some integer m,

$$P = \sum_{-\infty < j \le m} p_j$$

where each $p_j$ is a holomorphic function on $U$ that is homogeneous of degree $j$ in the second variable.

The sheaf $\mathcal{E}$ of microdifferential operators on $T^* X$ is then the subsheaf of $\widehat{\mathcal{E}}$ consisting of those sections satisfying the growth condition on the negative terms; namely, for each compact subset $K \subset U$, there exists an $\epsilon > 0$ such that

$\sum_{j \le 0} \sup_K|p_j| \epsilon^{-j}/(-j)! < \infty.$

== See also ==
- Pseudodifferential operator
