= Christine Berkesch =

American mathematician

Christine Mary Berkesch is an American mathematician specializing in algebraic geometry, particularly including homology-related invariants arising from group actions on algebraic varieties. She is a professor in the School of Mathematics at the University of Minnesota.

== Education and career ==
Berkesch majored in mathematics at Butler University, where she graduated with honors in 2004. She continued her studies at Purdue University, and completed her Ph.D. there in 2010. Her dissertation, Euler–Koszul Homology in Algebra and Geometry, was supervised by Uli Walther.

Next, she became an NSF International Postdoctoral Fellow at Stockholm University, hosted there by Mikael Passare. She continued her postdoctoral research at the Mittag-Leffler Institute in Stockholm, at the Mathematical Sciences Research Institute in Berkeley, California, and as an assistant research professor at Duke University, where she worked from 2011 to 2013.

In 2013, she obtained a tenure-track position as an assistant professor of mathematics at the University of Minnesota. She was tenured as an associate professor in 2019, and promoted to full professor in 2024.

== Recognition ==
Berkesch was named as a Fellow of the American Mathematical Society, in its 2027 class of fellows.
