= Hyperfunction =

Type of generalized function

In mathematics, hyperfunctions are generalizations of functions, as a 'jump' from one holomorphic function to another at a boundary, and can be thought of informally as distributions of infinite order. Hyperfunctions were introduced by Mikio Sato in 1958 in Japanese, (1959, 1960 in English), building upon earlier work by Laurent Schwartz, Grothendieck and others.

== Formulation ==
A hyperfunction on the real line can be conceived of as the 'difference' between one holomorphic function defined on the upper half-plane and another on the lower half-plane. That is, a hyperfunction is specified by a pair (f, g), where f is a holomorphic function on the upper half-plane and g is a holomorphic function on the lower half-plane.

Informally, the hyperfunction is what the difference $f -g$ would be at the real line itself. This difference is not affected by adding the same holomorphic function to both f and g, so if h is a holomorphic function on the whole complex plane, the hyperfunctions (f, g) and (f + h, g + h) are defined to be equivalent.

=== Definition in one dimension ===
The motivation can be concretely implemented using ideas from sheaf cohomology. Let $\mathcal{O}$ be the sheaf of holomorphic functions on $\Complex.$ Define the hyperfunctions on the real line as the first local cohomology group:

$$\mathcal{B}(\R) = H^1_{\R}(\Complex , \mathcal{O}).$$

Concretely, let $\Complex^+$ and $\Complex^-$ be the upper half-plane and lower half-plane respectively. Then $\Complex^+ \cup \Complex^- = \Complex \setminus \R$ so

$$H^1_{\R  }(\Complex , \mathcal{O}) = \left [ H^0(\Complex ^+, \mathcal{O}) \oplus H^0(\Complex ^-, \mathcal{O}) \right ] /H^0(\Complex , \mathcal{O}).$$

Since the zeroth cohomology group of any sheaf is simply the global sections of that sheaf, we see that a hyperfunction is a pair of holomorphic functions one each on the upper and lower complex halfplane modulo entire holomorphic functions.

More generally one can define $\mathcal{B}(U)$ for any open set $U\subseteq\R$ as the quotient $H^0(\tilde{U}\setminus U,\mathcal{O}) / H^0(\tilde{U},\mathcal{O})$ where $\tilde{U}\subseteq\Complex$ is any open set with $\tilde{U}\cap\mathbb{R}=U$. One can show that this definition does not depend on the choice of $\tilde{U}$ giving another reason to think of hyperfunctions as "boundary values" of holomorphic functions.

== Examples ==
- If f is any holomorphic function on the whole complex plane, then the restriction of f to the real axis is a hyperfunction, represented by either (f, 0) or (0, −f).
- The Heaviside step function can be represented as
  $$H(x) = \left(1-\frac{1}{2\pi i}\log(z),-\frac{1}{2\pi i}\log(z)\right).$$
  where $\log(z)$ is the principal value of the complex logarithm of z.
- The Dirac delta "function" is represented by
  $$\left(\dfrac{1}{2\pi iz}, \dfrac{1}{2\pi iz}\right).$$
  This is really a restatement of Cauchy's integral formula. To verify it one can calculate the integration of f just below the real line, and subtract integration of g just above the real line – both from left to right. Note that the hyperfunction can be non-trivial, even if the components are analytic continuation of the same function. Also this can be easily checked by differentiating the Heaviside function.
- If g is a continuous function (or more generally a distribution) on the real line with support contained in a bounded interval I, then g corresponds to the hyperfunction (f, −f), where f is a holomorphic function on the complement of I defined by
  $$f(z)= \frac 1 {2\pi i} \int_{x\in I} g(x) \frac 1 {z-x} \, dx.$$
  This function f jumps in value by g(x) when crossing the real axis at the point x. The formula for f follows from the previous example by writing g as the convolution of itself with the Dirac delta function.
- Using a partition of unity one can write any continuous function (distribution) as a locally finite sum of functions (distributions) with compact support. This can be exploited to extend the above embedding to an embedding $\textstyle\mathcal{D}'(\R)\to\mathcal{B}(\R).$
- If f is any function that is holomorphic everywhere except for an essential singularity at 0 (for example, e^{1/z}), then $(f, -f)$ is a hyperfunction with support 0 that is not a distribution. If f has a pole of finite order at 0 then $(f, -f)$ is a distribution, so when f has an essential singularity then $(f, -f)$ looks like a "distribution of infinite order" at 0. (Note that distributions always have finite order at any point.)

== Operations on hyperfunctions ==
Let $U\subseteq\R$ be any open subset.

- By definition $\mathcal{B}(U)$ is a vector space such that addition and multiplication with complex numbers are well-defined. Explicitly:
  $$a(f_+,f_-)+b(g_+,g_-) := (af_++bg_+, af_-+bg_-)$$
- The obvious restriction maps turn $\mathcal{B}$ into a sheaf (which is in fact flabby).
- Multiplication with real analytic functions $h\in\mathcal{O}(U)$ and differentiation are well-defined:
  $$\begin{align}
h(f_+,f_-) &:= (hf_+, hf_-) \\ [6pt]
\frac{d}{dz}(f_+,f_-) &:= \left (\frac{df_+}{dz},\frac{df_-}{dz} \right)
\end{align}$$
  With these definitions $\mathcal{B}(U)$ becomes a D-module and the embedding $\mathcal{D}'\hookrightarrow\mathcal{B}$ is a morphism of D-modules.
- A point $a\in U$ is called a holomorphic point of $f\in\mathcal{B}(U)$ if $f$ restricts to a real analytic function in some small neighbourhood of $a.$ If $a\leqslant b$ are two holomorphic points, then integration is well-defined:
  $$\int_a^b f := -\int_{\gamma_+} f_+(z) \, dz + \int_{\gamma_-} f_-(z) \, dz$$
  where $\gamma_{\pm}:[0,1] \to \Complex^{\pm}$ are arbitrary curves with $\gamma_{\pm}(0)=a, \gamma_{\pm}(1)=b.$ The integrals are independent of the choice of these curves because the upper and lower half plane are simply connected.
- Let $\mathcal{B}_\text{c}(U)$ be the space of hyperfunctions with compact support. Via the bilinear form
  $$\begin{cases}
\mathcal{B}_\text{c}(U)\times\mathcal{O}(U)\to\Complex \\
(f,\varphi)\mapsto\int f \cdot \varphi
\end{cases}$$
  one associates to each hyperfunction with compact support a continuous linear function on $\mathcal{O}(U).$ This induces an identification of the dual space, $\mathcal{O}'(U),$ with $\mathcal{B}_\text{c}(U).$ A special case worth considering is the case of continuous functions or distributions with compact support: If one considers $C_\text{c}^0(U)$ (or $\mathcal{E}'(U)$) as a subset of $\mathcal{B}(U)$ via the above embedding, then this computes exactly the traditional Lebesgue-integral. Furthermore: If $u\in\mathcal{E}'(U)$ is a distribution with compact support, $\varphi\in\mathcal{O}(U)$ is a real analytic function, and $\operatorname{supp}(u)\subset(a,b)$ then
  $$\int_a^b u\cdot\varphi = \langle u,\varphi\rangle.$$
  Thus this notion of integration gives a precise meaning to formal expressions like
  $$\int_a^b \delta(x) \, dx$$
  which are undefined in the usual sense. Moreover: Because the real analytic functions are dense in $\mathcal{E}(U), \mathcal{E}'(U)$ is a subspace of $\mathcal{O}'(U)$. This is an alternative description of the same embedding $\mathcal{E}'\hookrightarrow\mathcal{B}$.
- If $\Phi:U\to V$ is a real analytic map between open sets of $\R$, then composition with $\Phi$ is a well-defined operator from $\mathcal{B}(V)$ to $\mathcal{B}(U)$:
  $$f\circ\Phi := (f_+\circ\Phi,f_-\circ\Phi)$$

== See also ==
- Algebraic analysis
- Generalized function
- Distribution (mathematics)
- Microlocal analysis
- Pseudo-differential operator
- Sheaf cohomology
