= Takurō Mochizuki =

Japanese mathematician (born 1972)

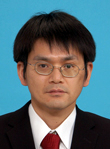
Takurō Mochizuki

Takurō Mochizuki (望月 拓郎, born 28 August 1972) is a Japanese mathematician at Kyoto University.

== Overview ==
As a student at the University of Kyoto in 1994, Mochizuki left his undergraduate studies early to become a graduate student in mathematics at the same university. He completed his Ph.D. in 1999, and joined the faculty of Osaka City University, returning to Kyoto in 2004.

== Awards ==
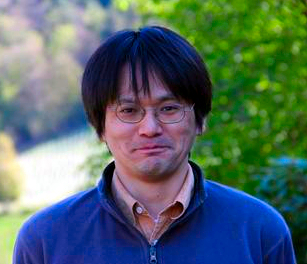
Takurō Mochizuki in Oberwolfach, Germany in 2015

He was awarded the Japan Academy Prize in 2011 for his research on D-modules in algebraic analysis. In 2014 he was a plenary speaker at the International Congress of Mathematicians.

Mochizuki was awarded the 2022 Breakthrough Prize in Mathematics for his work on "the theory of bundles with flat connections over algebraic varieties". The same year, he became a laureate of the Asian Scientist 100 by the Asian Scientist.
