= D-module =

Module over a sheaf of differential operators

In mathematics, a D-module is a module over a ring D of differential operators. The major interest of such D-modules is as an approach to the theory of linear partial differential equations. Since around 1970, D-module theory has been built up, mainly as a response to the ideas of Mikio Sato on algebraic analysis, and expanding on the work of Sato and Joseph Bernstein on the Bernstein–Sato polynomial.

Early major results were the Kashiwara constructibility theorem and Kashiwara index theorem of Masaki Kashiwara. The methods of D-module theory have always been drawn from sheaf theory and other techniques with inspiration from the work of Alexander Grothendieck in algebraic geometry. This approach is global in character, and differs from the functional analysis techniques traditionally used to study differential operators. The strongest results are obtained for over-determined systems (holonomic systems), and on the characteristic variety cut out by the symbols, which in the good case is a Lagrangian submanifold of the cotangent bundle of maximal dimension (involutive systems). The techniques were taken up from the side of the Grothendieck school by Zoghman Mebkhout, who obtained a general, derived category version of the Riemann–Hilbert correspondence in all dimensions.

== Modules over the Weyl algebra ==
The first case of algebraic D-modules are modules over the Weyl algebra A_{n}(K) over a field K of characteristic zero. It is the algebra consisting of polynomials in the following variables

x_{1}, ..., x_{n}, ∂_{1}, ..., ∂_{n}.

where the variables x_{i} and ∂_{j} separately commute with each other, and x_{i} and ∂_{j} commute for i ≠ j, but the commutator satisfies the relation

[∂_{i}, x_{i}] = ∂_{i}x_{i} − x_{i}∂_{i} = 1.

For any polynomial f(x_{1}, ..., x_{n}), this implies the relation

[∂_{i}, f] = ∂f / ∂x_{i},

thereby relating the Weyl algebra to differential equations.

An (algebraic) D-module is, by definition, a left module over the ring A_{n}(K). Examples for D-modules include the Weyl algebra itself (acting on itself by left multiplication), the (commutative) polynomial ring K[x_{1}, ..., x_{n}], where x_{i} acts by multiplication and ∂_{j} acts by partial differentiation with respect to x_{j} and, in a similar vein, the ring $\mathcal O(\mathbf C^n)$ of holomorphic functions on C^{n} (functions of n complex variables.)

Given some differential operator P = a_{n}(x) ∂^{n} + ... + a_{1}(x) ∂^{1} + a_{0}(x), where x is a complex variable, a_{i}(x) are polynomials, the quotient module M = A_{1}(C)/A_{1}(C)P is closely linked to space of solutions of the differential equation

P f = 0,

where f is some holomorphic function in C, say. The vector space consisting of the solutions of that equation is given by the space of homomorphisms of D-modules $\mathrm{Hom} (M, \mathcal O(\mathbf C))$.

== D-modules on algebraic varieties ==
The general theory of D-modules is developed on a smooth algebraic variety X defined over an algebraically closed field K of characteristic zero, such as K = C. The sheaf of differential operators D_{X} is defined to be the O_{X}-algebra generated by the vector fields on X, interpreted as derivations. A (left) D_{X}-module M is an O_{X}-module with a left action of D_{X} on it. Giving such an action is equivalent to specifying a K-linear map

$$\nabla: D_X \rightarrow \operatorname{End}_K(M), v \mapsto \nabla_v$$

satisfying

$$\nabla_{f v}(m) = f \, \nabla_v (m)$$
$\nabla_v (f m) = v(f) m + f \, \nabla_v (m)$ (Leibniz rule)
$$\nabla_{[v, w]}(m) = [\nabla_v, \nabla_w](m)$$

Here f is a regular function on X, v and w are vector fields, $m \in M$, and [−, −] denotes the commutator. Therefore, if M is in addition a locally free O_{X}-module, giving M a D-module structure is nothing else than equipping the vector bundle associated to M with a flat (or integrable) connection.

As the ring D_{X} is noncommutative, left and right D-modules have to be distinguished. However, the two notions can be exchanged, since there is an equivalence of categories between both types of modules, given by mapping a left module M to the tensor product M ⊗ Ω_{X}, where Ω_{X} is the line bundle given by the highest exterior power of differential 1-forms on X. This bundle has a natural right action determined by

ω ⋅ v := − Lie_{v} (ω),

where v is a differential operator of order one, that is to say a vector field, ω a n-form (n = dim X), and Lie denotes the Lie derivative.

Locally, after choosing some system of coordinates x_{1}, ..., x_{n} (n = dim X) on X, which determine a basis ∂_{1}, ..., ∂_{n} of the tangent space of X, sections of D_{X} can be uniquely represented as expressions

$\sum f_{i_1, \dots, i_n} \partial_1^{i_1} \cdots \partial_n^{i_n}$, where the $f_{i_1, \dots, i_n}$ are regular functions on X.

In particular, when X is the n-dimensional affine space, this D_{X} is the Weyl algebra in n variables.

Many basic properties of D-modules are local and parallel the situation of coherent sheaves. This builds on the fact that D_{X} is a locally free sheaf of O_{X}-modules, albeit of infinite rank, as the above-mentioned O_{X}-basis shows. A D_{X}-module that is coherent as an O_{X}-module can be shown to be necessarily locally free (of finite rank).

=== Functoriality ===
D-modules on different algebraic varieties are connected by pullback and pushforward functors comparable to the ones for coherent sheaves. For a map f: X → Y of smooth varieties, the definitions are this:

D_{X→Y} := O_{X} ⊗_{f^{−1}(O_{Y})} f^{−1}(D_{Y})

This is equipped with a left D_{X} action in a way that emulates the chain rule, and with the natural right action of f^{−1}(D_{Y}). The pullback is defined as

f^{∗}(M) := D_{X→Y} ⊗_{f^{−1}(D_{Y})} f^{−1}(M).

Here M is a left D_{Y}-module, while its pullback is a left module over X. This functor is right exact, its left derived functor is denoted Lf^{∗}. Conversely, for a right D_{X}-module N,

f_{∗}(N) := f_{∗}(N ⊗_{D_{X}} D_{X→Y})

is a right D_{Y}-module. Since this mixes the right exact tensor product with the left exact pushforward, it is common to set instead

f_{∗}(N) := Rf_{∗}(N ⊗^{L}_{D_{X}} D_{X→Y}).

Because of this, much of the theory of D-modules is developed using the full power of homological algebra, in particular derived categories.

== Holonomic modules ==
=== Holonomic modules over the Weyl algebra ===
It can be shown that the Weyl algebra is a (left and right) Noetherian ring. Moreover, it is simple, that is to say, its only two-sided ideals are the zero ideal and the whole ring. These properties make the study of D-modules manageable. Notably, standard notions from commutative algebra such as Hilbert polynomial, multiplicity and length of modules carry over to D-modules. More precisely, D_{X} is equipped with the Bernstein filtration, that is, the filtration such that F^{p}A_{n}(K) consists of K-linear combinations of differential operators x^{α}∂^{β} with |α| + |β| ≤ p (using multiindex notation). The associated graded ring is seen to be isomorphic to the polynomial ring in 2n indeterminates. In particular it is commutative.

Finitely generated D-modules M are endowed with so-called "good" filtrations F^{∗}M, which are ones compatible with F^{∗}A_{n}(K), essentially parallel to the situation of the Artin–Rees lemma. The Hilbert polynomial is defined to be the numerical polynomial that agrees with the function

n ↦ dim_{K} F^{n}M

for large n. The dimension d(M) of an A_{n}(K)-module M is defined to be the degree of the Hilbert polynomial. It is bounded by the Bernstein inequality

n ≤ d(M) ≤ 2n.

A module whose dimension attains the least possible value, n, is called holonomic.

The A_{1}(K)-module M = A_{1}(K)/A_{1}(K)P (see above) is holonomic for any nonzero differential operator P, but a similar claim for higher-dimensional Weyl algebras does not hold.

=== General definition ===
As mentioned above, modules over the Weyl algebra correspond to D-modules on affine space. The Bernstein filtration not being available on D_{X} for general varieties X, the definition is generalized to arbitrary affine smooth varieties X by means of order filtration on D_{X}, defined by the order of differential operators. The associated graded ring gr D_{X} is given by regular functions on the cotangent bundle T^{∗}X.

The characteristic variety is defined to be the subvariety of the cotangent bundle cut out by the radical of the annihilator of gr M, where again M is equipped with a suitable filtration (with respect to the order filtration on D_{X}). As usual, the affine construction then glues to arbitrary varieties.

The Bernstein inequality continues to hold for any (smooth) variety X. While the upper bound is an immediate consequence of the above interpretation of gr D_{X} in terms of the cotangent bundle, the lower bound is more subtle.

=== Properties and characterizations ===
Holonomic modules have a tendency to behave like finite-dimensional vector spaces. For example, their length is finite. Also, M is holonomic if and only if all cohomology groups of the complex Li^{∗}(M) are finite-dimensional K-vector spaces, where i is the closed immersion of any point of X.

For any D-module M, the dual module is defined by

$$\mathrm D(M) := \mathcal R \operatorname{Hom} (M, D_X) \otimes \Omega^{-1}_X [\dim X].$$

Holonomic modules can also be characterized by a homological condition: M is holonomic if and only if D(M) is concentrated (seen as an object in the derived category of D-modules) in degree 0. This fact is a first glimpse of Verdier duality and the Riemann–Hilbert correspondence. It is proven by extending the homological study of regular rings (especially what is related to global homological dimension) to the filtered ring D_{X}.

Another characterization of holonomic modules is via symplectic geometry. The characteristic variety Ch(M) of any D-module M is, seen as a subvariety of the cotangent bundle T^{∗}X of X, an involutive variety. The module is holonomic if and only if Ch(M) is Lagrangian.

== Applications ==
One of the early applications of holonomic D-modules was the Bernstein–Sato polynomial.

=== Kazhdan–Lusztig conjecture ===
The Kazhdan–Lusztig conjecture was proved using D-modules.

=== Riemann–Hilbert correspondence ===
The Riemann–Hilbert correspondence establishes a link between certain D-modules and constructible sheaves. As such, it provided a motivation for introducing perverse sheaves.

=== Geometric representation theory ===
D-modules are also applied in geometric representation theory. A main result in this area is the Beilinson–Bernstein localization. It relates D-modules on flag varieties G/B to representations of the Lie algebra $\mathfrak g$ of a reductive group G. D-modules are also crucial in the formulation of the geometric Langlands program.

== Bibliography ==
- Beilinson, A. A.; Bernstein, Joseph (1981), "Localisation de g-modules", Comptes Rendus de l'Académie des Sciences, Série I, 292 (1): 15–18, ISSN 0249-6291, MR 0610137
- Björk, J.-E. (1979), Rings of differential operators, North-Holland Mathematical Library, vol. 21, Amsterdam: North-Holland, ISBN 978-0-444-85292-2, MR 0549189
- Brylinski, Jean-Luc; Kashiwara, Masaki (1981), "Kazhdan–Lusztig conjecture and holonomic systems", Inventiones Mathematicae, 64 (3): 387–410, Bibcode:1981InMat..64..387B, doi:10.1007/BF01389272, ISSN 0020-9910, MR 0632980, S2CID 18403883
- Coutinho, S. C. (1995), A primer of algebraic D-modules, London Mathematical Society Student Texts, vol. 33, Cambridge University Press, ISBN 978-0-521-55119-9, MR 1356713
- Borel, Armand, ed. (1987), Algebraic D-Modules, Perspectives in Mathematics, vol. 2, Boston, MA: Academic Press, ISBN 978-0-12-117740-9
- M.G.M. van Doorn (2001) [1994], "D-module", Encyclopedia of Mathematics, EMS Press
- Hotta, Ryoshi; Takeuchi, Kiyoshi; Tanisaki, Toshiyuki (2008), D-modules, perverse sheaves, and representation theory (PDF), Progress in Mathematics, vol. 236, Boston, MA: Birkhäuser Boston, ISBN 978-0-8176-4363-8, MR 2357361, archived from the original (PDF) on 2016-03-03
