= Research Institute for Mathematical Sciences =

Research institute affiliated with Kyoto University

Coordinates: 35°1′49.19″N 135°47′8.98″E

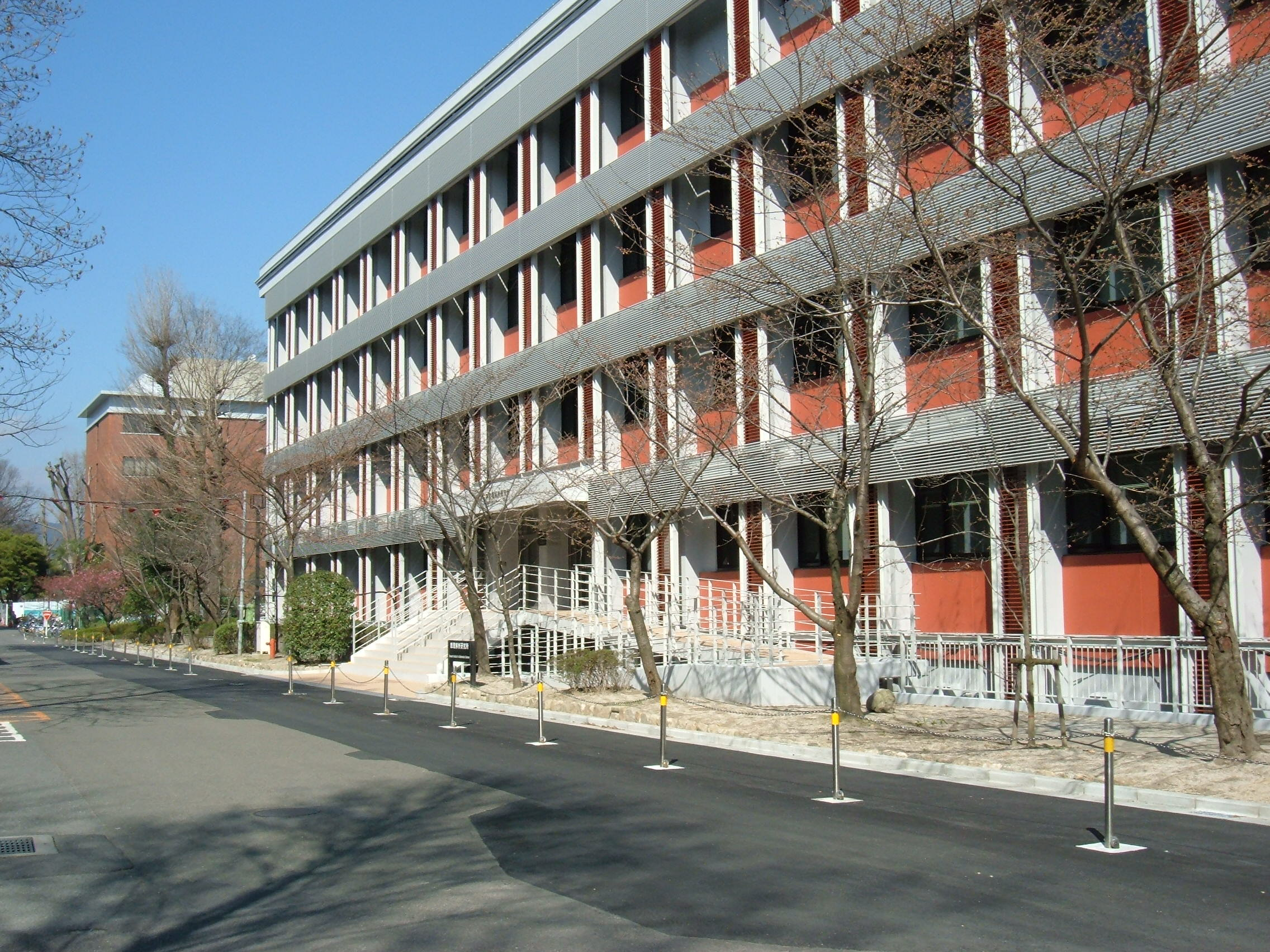
Research Institute for Mathematical Sciences, Kyoto University

The Research Institute for Mathematical Sciences (数理解析研究所, Sūri Kaiseki Kenkyūsho; RIMS) is a research institute attached to Kyoto University, hosting researchers in the mathematical sciences from all over Japan. RIMS was founded in April 1963.

== List of directors ==
- Masuo Fukuhara (1963.5.1 – 1969.3.31)
- Kōsaku Yosida (1969.4.1 – 1972.3.31)
- Hisaaki Yoshizawa (1972.4.1 – 1976.3.31)
- Kiyoshi Itō (1976.4.1 – 1979.4.1)
- Nobuo Shimada (1979.4.2 – 1983.4.1)
- Heisuke Hironaka (1983.4.2 – 1985.1.30)
- Nobuo Shimada (1985.1.31 – 1987.1.30)
- Mikio Sato (1987.1.31 – 1991.1.30)
- Satoru Takasu (1991.1.31 – 1993.1.30)
- Huzihiro Araki (1993.1.31 – 1996.3.31)
- Kyōji Saitō (1996.4.1 – 1998.3.31)
- Masatake Mori (1998.4.1 – 2001.3.31)
- Masaki Kashiwara (2001.4.1 – 2003.3.31)
- Yōichirō Takahashi (2003.4.1 – 2007.3.31)
- Masaki Kashiwara (2007.4.1 – 2009.3.31)
- Shigeru Morishige (2009.4.1 – 2011.3.31)
- Shigefumi Mori (2011.4.1 – 2014.3.31)
- Shigeru Mukai (2014.4.1 – 2017.3.31)
- Michio Yamada (2017.4.1 – 2020.3.31)
- Takashi Kumagai (2020.4.1 – 2022.3.31)
- Kaoru Ono (2022.4.1 – 2024.3.31)
- Koji Okitani (2024.4.1 – 2026.3.31)
- Yoshinori Namikawa (2026.4.1 – present)

== Notable researchers ==
=== Current researchers ===
- Takashi Kumagai
- Shinichi Mochizuki
- Takurō Mochizuki, a plenary speaker at the International Congress of Mathematicians in 2014.
- Shigeru Mukai
- Kaoru Ono
- Morihiko Saitō

=== Past researchers ===
- Heisuke Hironaka, Fields Medalist
- Kiyoshi Itō, Wolf Prize in Mathematics laureater
- Kazuya Kato
- Shigefumi Mori, Fields Medalist
- Masaki Kashiwara, Chern Medal and Abel Prize winner
- Hiraku Nakajima, Cole Prize laureate
- Mikio Sato, Wolf Prize in Mathematics laureater
