= Algebraic analysis =

Technique of studying linear partial differential equations

Algebraic analysis is an area of mathematics that deals with systems of linear partial differential equations by using sheaf theory and complex analysis to study properties and generalizations of functions such as hyperfunctions and microfunctions. Semantically, algebraic analysis is the application of algebraic operations on analytic quantities. As a research programme, it was started by the Japanese mathematician Mikio Sato in 1959. This can be seen as an algebraic geometrization of analysis. According to Schapira, parts of Sato's work can be regarded as a manifestation of Grothendieck's style of mathematics within the realm of classical analysis. It derives its meaning from the fact that the differential operator is right-invertible in several function spaces.

It helps in the simplification of the proofs due to an algebraic description of the problem considered.

== Microfunction ==
Let M be a real-analytic manifold of dimension n, and let X be its complexification. The sheaf of microlocal functions on M is given as

$$\mathcal{H}^n(\mu_M(\mathcal{O}_X) \otimes \mathcal{or}_{M/X})$$

where

- $\mu_M$ denotes the microlocalization functor,
- $\mathcal{or}_{M/X}$ is the relative orientation sheaf.

A microfunction can be used to define a Sato's hyperfunction. By definition, the sheaf of Sato's hyperfunctions on M is the restriction of the sheaf of microfunctions to M, in parallel to the fact the sheaf of real-analytic functions on M is the restriction of the sheaf of holomorphic functions on X to M.

== See also ==
- Hyperfunction
- D-module
- Microlocal analysis
- Generalized function
- Edge-of-the-wedge theorem
- FBI transform
- Localization of a ring
- Vanishing cycle
- Gauss–Manin connection
- Differential algebra
- Perverse sheaf
- Mikio Sato
- Masaki Kashiwara
- Lars Hörmander
- Microdifferential operator

== Sources ==
- Kashiwara, Masaki; Kawai, Takahiro (2011). "Professor Mikio Sato and Microlocal Analysis". Publications of the Research Institute for Mathematical Sciences. 47 (1): 11–17. doi:10.2977/PRIMS/29 – via EMS-PH.
- Kashiwara, Masaki; Schapira, Pierre (1990). Sheaves on Manifolds. Berlin: Springer-Verlag. ISBN 3-540-51861-4.
