= Support (mathematics) =

Inputs for which a function's value is non-zero

In mathematics, the support of a real-valued function $f$ is the subset of the function's domain consisting of those elements that are not mapped to zero. If the domain of $f$ is a topological space, then the support of $f$ is instead defined as the smallest closed set containing all points not mapped to zero. This concept is used widely in mathematical analysis.

== Formulation ==
Suppose that $f : X \to \R$ is a real-valued function whose domain is an arbitrary set $X.$ The set-theoretic support of $f,$ written $\operatorname{supp}(f),$ is the set of points in $X$ where $f$ is non-zero:
$$\operatorname{supp}(f) = \{ x \in X \,:\, f(x) \neq 0\}.$$

The support of $f$ is the smallest subset of $X$ with the property that $f$ is zero on the subset's complement.

If the set $X$ has an additional structure (for example, a topology), then the support of $f$ is defined in an analogous way as the smallest subset of $X$ of an appropriate type such that $f$ vanishes in an appropriate sense on its complement. The notion of support also extends in a natural way to functions taking values in more general sets than $\R$ and to other objects, such as measures or distributions.

== Closed support ==
The most common situation occurs when $X$ is a topological space (such as the real line or $n$-dimensional Euclidean space) and $f : X \to \R$ is a continuous real- (or complex-) valued function. In this case, the support of $f$, $\operatorname{supp}(f)$, or the closed support of $f$, is defined topologically as the closure (taken in $X$) of the subset of $X$ where $f$ is non-zero that is,
$$\operatorname{supp}(f) := \operatorname{cl}_X\left(\{x \in X \,:\, f(x) \neq 0 \}\right) = \overline{f^{-1}\left(\{ 0 \}^{\mathrm{c}}\right)}.$$
Since the intersection of closed sets is closed, $\operatorname{supp}(f)$ is the intersection of all closed sets that contain the set-theoretic support of $f.$ Note that if the function $f: \mathbb{R}^n \supseteq X \to \mathbb{R}$ is defined on an open subset $X \subseteq \mathbb{R}^n$, then the closure is still taken with respect to $X$ and not with respect to the ambient $\mathbb{R}^n$.

For example, if $f : \R \to \R$ is the function defined by
$$f(x) = \begin{cases} 1 - x^2 & \text{if } |x| < 1 \\ 0 & \text{if } |x| \geq 1 \end{cases}$$
then $\operatorname{supp}(f)$, the support of $f$, or the closed support of $f$, is the closed interval $[-1, 1],$ since $f$ is non-zero on the open interval $(-1, 1)$ and the closure of this set is $[-1, 1].$

The notion of closed support is usually applied to continuous functions, but the definition makes sense for arbitrary real or complex-valued functions on a topological space, and some authors do not require that $f : X \to \R$ (or $f : X \to \Complex$) be continuous.

== Compact support ==
Functions with compact support on a topological space $X$ are those whose closed support is a compact subset of $X.$ If $X$ is the real line, or $n$-dimensional Euclidean space, then a function has compact support if and only if it has bounded support, since a subset of $\R^n$ is compact if and only if it is closed and bounded.

For example, the function $f : \R \to \R$ defined above is a continuous function with compact support $[-1, 1].$ If $f : \R^n \to \R$ is a smooth function then because $f$ is identically $0$ on the open subset $\R^n \setminus \operatorname{supp}(f),$ all of $f$'s partial derivatives of all orders are also identically $0$ on $\R^n \setminus \operatorname{supp}(f).$

The condition of compact support is stronger than the condition of vanishing at infinity. For example, the function $f : \R \to \R$ defined by
$$f(x) = \frac{1}{1+x^2}$$
vanishes at infinity, since $f(x) \to 0$ as $|x| \to \infty$, but since there exists no $x \in \R$ such that $f(x) = 0$, the support of $f$ is the entire set $\R$, which is not compact.

Real-valued compactly supported smooth functions on a Euclidean space are sometimes called bump functions. Mollifiers are an important special case of bump functions as they can be used in distribution theory to create sequences of smooth functions approximating nonsmooth (generalized) functions, via convolution.

In a locally compact Hausdorff space, continuous functions with compact support are dense in the space of continuous functions that vanish at infinity. As an intuition for more complex examples, and in the language of limits, for any $\varepsilon > 0,$ any function $f$ on the real line $\R$ that vanishes at infinity can be approximated by choosing an appropriate compact subset $C$ of $\R$ such that
$$\left|f(x) - I_C(x) f(x)\right| < \varepsilon$$
for all $x \in X,$ where $I_C$ is the indicator function of $C$. One then can then choose a continuous cutoff function that vanishes outside a small thickening of $C$.

In the theory of distributions, it is also true that the smooth compactly supported smooth functions are dense in the space of Schwartz functions. They are also dense in every Lp space for $p<\infty$. Thus in most good cases, the compactly supported functions of the appropriate class are dense in many different topologies, and so they are fundamental in analysis.

Every continuous function on a compact topological space has compact support since every closed subset of a compact space is indeed compact.

== Essential support ==
If $X$ is a topological measure space with a Borel measure $\mu$ (such as $\R^n,$ or a Lebesgue measurable subset of $\R^n,$ equipped with Lebesgue measure), then one typically identifies functions that are equal $\mu$-almost everywhere. In that case, the essential support of a measurable function $f : X \to \R$ written $\operatorname{ess\,supp}(f)$, is defined to be the smallest closed subset $F$ of $X$ such that $f = 0$ $\mu$-almost everywhere outside $F.$ Equivalently, $\operatorname{ess\,supp}(f)$ is the complement of the largest open set on which $f = 0$ $\mu$-almost everywhere
$$\operatorname{ess\,supp}(f) := X \setminus \bigcup \left\{\Omega \subseteq X : \Omega\text{ is open and } f = 0\, \mu\text{-almost everywhere in } \Omega \right\}.$$

The essential support of a function $f$ depends on the measure $\mu$ as well as on $f,$ and it may be strictly smaller than the closed support. For example, if $f : [0, 1] \to \R$ is the Dirichlet function that is $0$ on irrational numbers and $1$ on rational numbers, and $[0, 1]$ is equipped with Lebesgue measure, then the support of $f$ is the entire interval $[0, 1],$ but the essential support of $f$ is empty, since $f$ is equal almost everywhere to the zero function.

In analysis one nearly always wants to use the essential support of a function, rather than its closed support, when the two sets are different, so $\operatorname{ess\,supp}(f)$ is often written simply as $\operatorname{supp}(f)$ and referred to as the support.

== Generalization ==
If $M$ is an arbitrary set containing zero, the concept of support is immediately generalizable to functions $f : X \to M.$ Support may also be defined for any algebraic structure with identity (such as a group, monoid, or composition algebra), in which the identity element assumes the role of zero. For instance, the family $\Z^{\N}$ of functions from the natural numbers to the integers is the uncountable set of integer sequences. The subfamily $\left\{ f \in \Z^{\N} : f \text{ has finite support } \right\}$ is the countable set of all integer sequences that have only finitely many nonzero entries.

Functions of finite support are used in defining algebraic structures such as group rings and free abelian groups.

== In probability and measure theory ==
In probability theory, the support of a probability distribution can be loosely thought of as the closure of the set of possible values of a random variable having that distribution. There are, however, some subtleties to consider when dealing with general distributions defined on a sigma algebra, rather than on a topological space.

More formally, if $X : \Omega \to \R$ is a random variable on $(\Omega, \mathcal{F}, P)$ then the support of $X$ is the smallest closed set $R_X \subseteq \R$ such that $P\left(X \in R_X\right) = 1.$

In practice however, the support of a discrete random variable $X$ is often defined as the set $R_X = \{x \in \R : P(X = x) > 0 \}$ and the support of a continuous random variable $X$ is defined as the set $R_X = \{x \in \R : f_X(x) > 0 \}$ where $f_X(x)$ is a probability density function of $X$ (the set-theoretic support).

Note that the word support can refer to the logarithm of the likelihood of a probability density function.

== Support of a distribution ==
It is possible also to talk about the support of a distribution, such as the Dirac delta function $\delta(x)$ on the real line. In that example, we can consider test functions $F,$ which are smooth functions with support not including the point $0.$ Since $\delta(F)$ (the distribution $\delta$ applied as linear functional to $F$) is $0$ for such functions, we can say that the support of $\delta$ is $\{ 0 \}$ only. Since measures (including probability measures) on the real line are special cases of distributions, we can also speak of the support of a measure in the same way.

Suppose that $f$ is a distribution, and that $U$ is an open set in Euclidean space such that, for all test functions $\phi$ such that the support of $\phi$ is contained in $U,$ $f(\phi) = 0.$ Then $f$ is said to vanish on $U.$ Now, if $f$ vanishes on an arbitrary family $U_{\alpha}$ of open sets, then for any test function $\phi$ supported in $\bigcup U_{\alpha},$ a simple argument based on the compactness of the support of $\phi$ and a partition of unity shows that $f(\phi) = 0$ as well. Hence we can define the support of $f$ as the complement of the largest open set on which $f$ vanishes. For example, the support of the Dirac delta is $\{ 0 \}.$

== Singular support ==
In Fourier analysis in particular, it is interesting to study the singular support of a distribution. This has the intuitive interpretation as the set of points at which a distribution fails to be a smooth function.

For example, the Fourier transform of the Heaviside step function can, up to constant factors, be considered to be $1/x$ (a function) except at $x = 0.$ While $x = 0$ is clearly a special point, it is more precise to say that the transform of the distribution has singular support $\{ 0 \}$: it cannot accurately be expressed as a function in relation to test functions with support including $0.$ It can be expressed as an application of a Cauchy principal value improper integral.

For distributions in several variables, singular supports allow one to define wave front sets and understand Huygens' principle in terms of mathematical analysis. Singular supports may also be used to understand phenomena special to distribution theory, such as attempts to 'multiply' distributions (squaring the Dirac delta function fails – essentially because the singular supports of the distributions to be multiplied should be disjoint).

== Family of supports ==
An abstract notion of family of supports on a topological space $X,$ suitable for sheaf theory, was defined by Henri Cartan. In extending Poincaré duality to manifolds that are not compact, the 'compact support' idea enters naturally on one side of the duality; see for example Alexander–Spanier cohomology.

Bredon, Sheaf Theory (2nd edition, 1997) gives these definitions. A family $\Phi$ of closed subsets of $X$ is a family of supports, if it is down-closed and closed under finite union. Its extent is the union over $\Phi.$ A paracompactifying family of supports that satisfies further that any $Y$ in $\Phi$ is, with the subspace topology, a paracompact space; and has some $Z$ in $\Phi$ which is a neighbourhood. If $X$ is a locally compact space, assumed Hausdorff, the family of all compact subsets satisfies the further conditions, making it paracompactifying.

== See also ==
- Bounded function – Mathematical function whose set of values is bounded
- Bump function – Smooth and compactly supported function
- Support of a module
- Titchmarsh convolution theorem
