= Pseudo-differential operator =

Type of differential operator

In mathematical analysis a pseudo-differential operator is an extension of the concept of differential operator. Pseudo-differential operators are used extensively in the theory of partial differential equations and quantum field theory, e.g. in mathematical models that include ultrametric pseudo-differential equations in a non-Archimedean space.

== History ==
The study of pseudo-differential operators began in the mid 1960s with the work of Kohn, Nirenberg, Hörmander, Unterberger and Bokobza.

They played an influential role in the second proof of the Atiyah–Singer index theorem via K-theory. Atiyah and Singer thanked Hörmander for assistance with understanding the theory of pseudo-differential operators.

== Motivation ==
=== Linear differential operators with constant coefficients ===
Consider a linear differential operator with constant coefficients,

$$P(D) := \sum_\alpha a_\alpha \, D^\alpha$$

which acts on smooth functions $u$ with compact support in R^{n}. This operator can be written as a composition of a Fourier transform, a simple multiplication by the polynomial function (called the symbol)

$$P(\xi) = \sum_\alpha a_\alpha \, \xi^\alpha,$$

and an inverse Fourier transform, in the form:

$\quad P(D) u (x) = \frac{1}{(2 \pi)^n} \int_{\mathbb{R}^n} \int_{\mathbb{R}^n} e^{i (x - y) \xi} P(\xi) u(y)\, dy \, d\xi$	1

Here, $\alpha = (\alpha_1,\ldots,\alpha_n)$ is a multi-index, $a_\alpha$ are complex numbers, and

$$D^\alpha=(-i \partial_1)^{\alpha_1} \cdots (-i \partial_n)^{\alpha_n}$$

is an iterated partial derivative, where ∂_{j} means differentiation with respect to the j-th variable. We introduce the constants $-i$ to facilitate the calculation of Fourier transforms.

Derivation of formula (1)

The Fourier transform of a smooth function u, compactly supported in R^{n}, is

$$\hat u (\xi) := \int e^{- i y \xi} u(y) \, dy$$

and Fourier's inversion formula gives

$$u (x) = \frac{1}{(2 \pi)^n} \int e^{i x \xi} \hat u (\xi) d\xi =
\frac{1}{(2 \pi)^n} \iint e^{i (x - y) \xi} u (y) \, dy \, d\xi$$

By applying P(D) to this representation of u and using

$$P(D_x) \, e^{i (x - y) \xi} = e^{i (x - y) \xi} \, P(\xi)$$

one obtains formula (1).

=== Representation of solutions to partial differential equations ===
To solve the partial differential equation

$$P(D) \, u = f$$

we (formally) apply the Fourier transform on both sides and obtain the algebraic equation

$$P(\xi) \, \hat u (\xi) = \hat f(\xi).$$

If the symbol P(ξ) is never zero when ξ ∈ R^{n}, then it is possible to divide by P(ξ):

$$\hat u(\xi) = \frac{1}{P(\xi)} \hat f(\xi)$$

By Fourier's inversion formula, a solution is

$$u (x) = \frac{1}{(2 \pi)^n} \int e^{i x \xi} \frac{1}{P(\xi)} \hat f (\xi) \, d\xi.$$

Here it is assumed that:

1. P(D) is a linear differential operator with constant coefficients,
2. its symbol P(ξ) is never zero,
3. both u and ƒ have a well defined Fourier transform.

The last assumption can be weakened by using the theory of distributions. The first two assumptions can be weakened as follows.

In the last formula, write out the Fourier transform of ƒ to obtain

$$u (x) = \frac{1}{(2 \pi)^n} \iint e^{i (x-y) \xi} \frac{1}{P(\xi)} f (y) \, dy \, d\xi.$$

This is similar to formula (1), except that 1/P(ξ) is not a polynomial function, but a function of a more general kind.

== Definition of pseudo-differential operators ==
Here we view pseudo-differential operators as a generalization of differential operators. We extend formula (1) as follows. A pseudo-differential operator P(x,D) on R^{n} is an operator whose value on the function u(x) is the function of x:

$\quad P(x,D) u (x) = \frac{1}{(2 \pi)^n} \int_{\mathbb{R}^n} e^{i x\cdot \xi} P(x,\xi) \hat{u}(\xi) \, d\xi$	2

where $\hat{u}(\xi)$ is the Fourier transform of u and the symbol P(x,ξ) in the integrand belongs to a certain symbol class. For instance, if P(x,ξ) is an infinitely differentiable function on R^{n} × R^{n} with the property

$$|\partial_\xi^\alpha \partial_x^\beta P(x,\xi)| \leq C_{\alpha,\beta} \, (1 + |\xi|)^{m - |\alpha|}$$

for all x,ξ ∈R^{n}, all multiindices α,β, some constants C_{α, β} and some real number m, then P belongs to the symbol class $\scriptstyle{S^m_{1,0}}$ of Hörmander. The corresponding operator P(x,D) is called a pseudo-differential operator of order m and belongs to the class $\Psi^m_{1,0}.$

== Properties ==
Linear differential operators of order m with smooth bounded coefficients are pseudo-differential operators of order m. The composition PQ of two pseudo-differential operators P, Q is again a pseudo-differential operator and the symbol of PQ can be calculated by using the symbols of P and Q. The adjoint and transpose of a pseudo-differential operator is a pseudo-differential operator.

If a differential operator of order m is (uniformly) elliptic (of order m) and invertible, then its inverse is a pseudo-differential operator of order −m, and its symbol can be calculated. This means that one can solve linear elliptic differential equations more or less explicitly by using the theory of pseudo-differential operators.

Differential operators are local in the sense that one only needs the value of a function in a neighbourhood of a point to determine the effect of the operator. Pseudo-differential operators are pseudo-local, which means informally that when applied to a distribution they do not create a singularity at points where the distribution was already smooth.

Just as a differential operator can be expressed in terms of D = −id/dx in the form

$$p(x, D)\,$$

for a polynomial p in D (which is called the symbol), a pseudo-differential operator has a symbol in a more general class of functions. Often one can reduce a problem in analysis of pseudo-differential operators to a sequence of algebraic problems involving their symbols, and this is the essence of microlocal analysis.

== Kernel of pseudo-differential operator ==
Pseudo-differential operators can be represented by kernels. The singularity of the kernel on the diagonal depends on the degree of the corresponding operator. In fact, if the symbol satisfies the above differential inequalities with m ≤ 0, it can be shown that the kernel is a singular integral kernel.

== See also ==
- Differential algebra for a definition of pseudo-differential operators in the context of differential algebras and differential rings.
- Fourier transform
- Fourier integral operator
- Oscillatory integral operator
- Sato's fundamental theorem
- Operational calculus
- Microdifferential operator
