= Microlocal analysis =

Techniques in mathematical analysis

Microlocal analysis is a branch of mathematical analysis that studies functions, generalized functions and partial differential equations by localizing them both in position and in frequency. The main idea is to describe a singularity not only by the point at which it occurs, but also by the cotangent direction in which it occurs. The term microlocal refers to localization at a small scale in phase space: locally near a point $x$ of a manifold and simultaneously near a nonzero covector $\xi$ at that point. This is finer than ordinary local analysis, which only distinguishes whether a function or distribution is regular near $x$. The information of position and covector in which a singularity occurs is encoded by the wave front set of a distribution, a conic subset of the cotangent bundle with the zero section removed.

Microlocal analysis was developed from the 1950s through the 1970s in connection with linear partial differential equations, Fourier transform methods, hyperfunctions and pseudo-differential operators. It is concerned with elliptic regularity, propagation of singularities, Fourier integral operators, geometric optics, scattering theory, spectral theory, semiclassical analysis and inverse problems.

== Microlocal smoothness ==
A key idea in microlocal analysis is that of smoothness. On $\mathbb{R}^n$, this is expressed using the Fourier transform. If $u$ is a distribution and $\phi$ is a smooth cutoff function supported near a point $x_0$, the decay of the Fourier transform $\widehat{\phi u}(\xi)$ as $|\xi|\to \infty$ detects whether $u$ is smooth near $x_0$. Microlocal analysis considers this decay only in a conic neighbourhood of a direction $\xi_0\neq 0$. If rapid decay holds in that conic neighbourhood, then $u$ is said to be microlocally smooth at $(x_0,\xi_0)$.

Thus microlocal smoothness is a weaker notion than ordinary smoothness: a distribution can be microlocally smooth in some directions at a point and not others.

One of the basic results in the area is microlocal elliptic regularity. If $P$ is a pseudodifferential operator that is elliptic near $(x_0,\xi_0)$, then $u$ is microlocally smooth at $(x_0,\xi_0)$ whenever $Pu$ is microlocally smooth there. Equivalently, singularities of a solution $u$ to an equation $Pu=f$ can occur away from the wave front set of $f$ only in the characteristic set of $P$.

== Wave front set ==
The wave front set $WF(u)$ of a distribution $u$ on a smooth manifold $X$ is the set of pairs $(x,\xi)$, with $\xi\neq 0$, at which $u$ is not microlocally smooth. It is a closed conic subset of $T^*X\setminus 0$, meaning that if $(x,\xi)$ belongs to $WF(u)$, then so does $(x,\lambda \xi)$ for every $\lambda>0$.

The projection of $WF(u)$ to $X$ is the singular support of $u$. Thus the wave front set contains the ordinary location of singularities, but also records their directions.

The wave front set of a Dirac delta distribution $\delta_{x_0}$ at a point $x_0$, for example, consists of all nonzero cotangent directions at $x_0$:

$$WF(\delta_{x_0})=\{(x_0,\xi):\xi\in T^*_{x_0}X,\ \xi\neq 0\}.$$

If a distribution has a jump discontinuity across a smooth hypersurface $S$, its wave front set is contained in the conormal bundle of $S$. The singularity is therefore concentrated in directions normal to the hypersurface.

== Pseudodifferential operators ==
Pseudo-differential operators generalize differential operators by allowing more general functions of the frequency variable. Locally, such an operator has the form

$$Au(x)=(2\pi)^{-n}\int e^{i x\cdot \xi} a(x,\xi)\widehat{u}(\xi)\,d\xi,$$

or, more generally, an oscillatory integral with an amplitude $a(x,\xi)$. The function $a$ is called the symbol of the operator.

The leading homogeneous part of the symbol is the principal symbol. It controls much of the microlocal behavior of the operator. An operator is elliptic at a point $(x,\xi)$ of the cotangent bundle if its principal symbol is nonzero there. The set where the principal symbol vanishes is the characteristic set of the operator.

Pseudodifferential operators are microlocal in the sense that they do not create new singularities in arbitrary directions:

$$WF(Au)\subseteq WF(u).$$

More precise statements involve the essential support of the symbol of $A$. Conversely, elliptic pseudodifferential operators can be inverted microlocally, which leads to microlocal forms of elliptic regularity.

== Propagation of singularities ==
For operators of real principal type, microlocal analysis gives a precise theorem on the propagation of singularities. Let $P$ have real principal symbol $p$. The Hamiltonian vector field $H_p$ on the cotangent bundle determines curves called bicharacteristics. The propagation of singularities theorem says, roughly, that the wave front set of a solution to $Pu=f$, outside the wave front set of $f$, is invariant along the bicharacteristic flow in the characteristic set of $P$.

This theorem gives a rigorous version of geometric optics. For hyperbolic equations, singularities travel along the rays determined by the Hamiltonian flow of the principal symbol. In the case of the wave equation on a Riemannian manifold, these rays are related to the geodesic flow. In Lorentzian geometry, the corresponding statement is that singularities of wave solutions propagate along null geodesics (null bicharacteristics).

== See also ==
- Algebraic analysis
- Microfunction
- Microdifferential operator
