= Differential operator =

Typically linear operator defined in terms of differentiation of functions

A harmonic function defined on an annulus. Harmonic functions are exactly those functions which lie in the kernel of the Laplace operator, an important differential operator.

In mathematics, a differential operator is an operator defined as a function of the differentiation operator (which is an operation that accepts a function and returns another function, i.e. a higher-order function).

This article considers mainly linear differential operators, which are the most common type. However, non-linear differential operators also exist, such as the Schwarzian derivative.

== Definition ==
Given a nonnegative integer m, an order-$m$ linear differential operator is a map $P$ from a function space $\mathcal{F}_1$ on $\mathbb{R}^n$ to another function space $\mathcal{F}_2$ that can be written as:

$$P = \sum_{|\alpha|\le m}a_\alpha(x) D^\alpha\ ,$$
where $\alpha = (\alpha_1,\alpha_2,\cdots,\alpha_n)$ is a multi-index of non-negative integers, $|\alpha| = \alpha_1 + \alpha_2 + \cdots + \alpha_n$, and for each $\alpha$, $a_\alpha(x)$ is a function on some open domain in n-dimensional space. The operator $D^\alpha$ is interpreted as

$$D^\alpha = \frac{\partial^{|\alpha|}}{\partial x_1^{\alpha_1}\partial x_2^{\alpha_2}\cdots\partial x_n^{\alpha_n}}$$

Thus for a function $f \in \mathcal{F}_1$:

$$P f = \sum_{|\alpha|\le m}a_\alpha(x) \frac{\partial^{|\alpha|}f}{\partial x_1^{\alpha_1}\partial x_2^{\alpha_2}\cdots\partial x_n^{\alpha_n}}$$

The polynomial p obtained by replacing partials $\frac{\partial}{\partial x_i}$ by variables $\xi_i$ in P is called the total symbol of P; i.e., the total symbol of P above is:
$$p(x, \xi) = \sum_{|\alpha|\le m}a_\alpha(x) \xi^\alpha$$
where $\xi^\alpha = \xi_1^{\alpha_1} \cdots \xi_n^{\alpha_n}.$ The highest homogeneous component of the symbol, namely,

$$\sigma(x, \xi) = \sum_{|\alpha|= m}a_\alpha(x) \xi^\alpha$$

is called the principal symbol of P. While the total symbol is not intrinsically defined, the principal symbol is intrinsically defined (i.e., it is a function on the cotangent bundle).

More generally, let E and F be vector bundles over a manifold X. Then the linear operator

$$P: C^\infty(E) \to C^\infty(F)$$

is a differential operator of order $k$ if, in local coordinates on X, we have

$$Pu(x)  = \sum_{|\alpha| = k} P^\alpha(x) \frac {\partial^\alpha u} {\partial x^{\alpha}} + \text{lower-order terms}$$

where, for each multi-index α, $P^\alpha(x):E \to F$ is a bundle map, symmetric on the indices α.

The k^{th} order coefficients of P transform as a symmetric tensor

$$\sigma_P: S^k (T^*X) \otimes E \to F$$

whose domain is the tensor product of the k^{th} symmetric power of the cotangent bundle of X with E, and whose codomain is F. This symmetric tensor is known as the principal symbol (or just the symbol) of P.

The coordinate system x^{i} permits a local trivialization of the cotangent bundle by the coordinate differentials dx^{i}, which determine fiber coordinates ξ_{i}. In terms of a basis of frames e_{μ}, f_{ν} of E and F, respectively, the differential operator P decomposes into components

$$(Pu)_\nu = \sum_\mu P_{\nu\mu}u_\mu$$

on each section u of E. Here P_{νμ} is the scalar differential operator defined by

$$P_{\nu\mu} = \sum_{\alpha} P_{\nu\mu}^\alpha\frac{\partial}{\partial x^\alpha}.$$

With this trivialization, the principal symbol can now be written

$$(\sigma_P(\xi)u)_\nu = \sum_{|\alpha|=k} \sum_{\mu}P_{\nu\mu}^\alpha(x)\xi_\alpha u_\mu.$$

In the cotangent space over a fixed point x of X, the symbol $\sigma_P$ defines a homogeneous polynomial of degree k in $T^*_x X$ with values in $\operatorname{Hom}(E_x, F_x)$.

== Fourier interpretation ==
A differential operator P and its symbol appear naturally in connection with the Fourier transform as follows. Let ƒ be a Schwartz function. Then by the inverse Fourier transform,

$$Pf(x) = \frac{1}{(2\pi)^{\frac{d}{2}}} \int\limits_{\mathbf{R}^d} e^{ ix\cdot\xi} p(x,i\xi)\hat{f}(\xi)\, d\xi.$$

This exhibits P as a Fourier multiplier. A more general class of functions p(x,ξ) which satisfy at most polynomial growth conditions in ξ under which this integral is well-behaved comprises the pseudo-differential operators.

== Examples ==
- The differential operator $P$ is elliptic if its symbol is invertible; that is for each nonzero $\theta \in T^*X$ the bundle map $\sigma_P (\theta, \dots, \theta)$ is invertible. On a compact manifold, it follows from the elliptic theory that P is a Fredholm operator: it has finite-dimensional kernel and cokernel.
- In the study of hyperbolic and parabolic partial differential equations, zeros of the principal symbol correspond to the characteristics of the partial differential equation.
- In applications to the physical sciences, operators such as the Laplace operator play a major role in setting up and solving partial differential equations.
- In differential topology, the exterior derivative and Lie derivative operators have intrinsic meaning.
- In abstract algebra, the concept of a derivation allows for generalizations of differential operators, which do not require the use of calculus. Frequently such generalizations are employed in algebraic geometry and commutative algebra. See also Jet (mathematics).
- In the development of holomorphic functions of a complex variable z = x + i y, sometimes a complex function is considered to be a function of two real variables x and y. Use is made of the Wirtinger derivatives, which are partial differential operators:
  $$\frac{\partial}{\partial z} = \frac{1}{2} \left( \frac{\partial}{\partial x} - i \frac{\partial}{\partial y} \right) \ ,\quad \frac{\partial}{\partial\bar{z}}= \frac{1}{2} \left( \frac{\partial}{\partial x} + i \frac{\partial}{\partial y} \right) \ .$$
  This approach is also used to study functions of several complex variables and functions of a motor variable.
- The differential operator del, also called nabla, is an important vector differential operator. It appears frequently in physics in places like the differential form of Maxwell's equations. In three-dimensional Cartesian coordinates, del is defined as

$$\nabla = \mathbf{\hat{x}} {\partial \over \partial x}  + \mathbf{\hat{y}} {\partial \over \partial y} + \mathbf{\hat{z}} {\partial \over \partial z}.$$
Del defines the gradient, and is used to calculate the curl, divergence, and Laplacian of various objects.

- A chiral differential operator. For now, see

== History ==
The conceptual step of writing a differential operator as something free-standing is attributed to Louis François Antoine Arbogast in 1800.

== Notations ==
The most common differential operator is the action of taking the derivative. Common notations for taking the first derivative with respect to a variable x include:

${d \over dx}$, $D$, $D_x,$ and $\partial_x$.

When taking higher, nth order derivatives, the operator may be written:

${d^n \over dx^n}$, $D^n$, $D^n_x$, or $\partial_x^n$.

The derivative of a function f of an argument x is sometimes given as either of the following:

$$[f(x)]'$$
$$f'(x).$$

The D notation's use and creation is credited to Oliver Heaviside, who considered differential operators of the form

$$\sum_{k=0}^n c_k D^k$$

in his study of differential equations.

One of the most frequently seen differential operators is the Laplacian operator, defined by

$$\Delta = \nabla^2 = \sum_{k=1}^n \frac{\partial^2}{\partial x_k^2}.$$

Another differential operator is the Θ operator, or theta operator, defined by

$$\Theta = z {d \over dz}.$$

This is sometimes also called the homogeneity operator, because its eigenfunctions are the monomials in z:
$$\Theta (z^k) = k z^k,\quad k=0,1,2,\dots$$

In n variables the homogeneity operator is given by
$$\Theta = \sum_{k=1}^n x_k \frac{\partial}{\partial x_k}.$$

As in one variable, the eigenspaces of Θ are the spaces of homogeneous functions. (Euler's homogeneous function theorem)

In writing, following common mathematical convention, the argument of a differential operator is usually placed on the right side of the operator itself. Sometimes an alternative notation is used: The result of applying the operator to the function on the left side of the operator and on the right side of the operator, and the difference obtained when applying the differential operator to the functions on both sides, are denoted by arrows as follows:

$$f \overleftarrow{\partial_x} g = g \cdot \partial_x f$$
$$f \overrightarrow{\partial_x} g = f \cdot \partial_x g$$
$$f \overleftrightarrow{\partial_x} g = f \cdot \partial_x g - g \cdot \partial_x f.$$

Such a bidirectional-arrow notation is frequently used for describing the probability current of quantum mechanics.

== Adjoint of an operator ==
Given a linear differential operator $T$
$$Tu = \sum_{k=0}^n a_k(x) D^k u$$
the adjoint of this operator is defined as the operator $T^*$ such that
$$\langle Tu,v \rangle = \langle u, T^*v \rangle$$
where the notation $\langle\cdot,\cdot\rangle$ is used for the scalar product or inner product. This definition therefore depends on the definition of the scalar product (or inner product).

=== Formal adjoint in one variable ===
In the functional space of square-integrable functions on a real interval (a, b), the scalar product is defined by
$$\langle f, g \rangle = \int_a^b  \overline{f(x)} \,g(x) \,dx ,$$

where the line over f(x) denotes the complex conjugate of f(x). If one moreover adds the condition that f or g vanishes as $x \to a$ and $x \to b$, one can also define the adjoint of T by
$$T^*u = \sum_{k=0}^n (-1)^k D^k \left[ \overline{a_k(x)} u \right].$$

This formula does not explicitly depend on the definition of the scalar product. It is therefore sometimes chosen as a definition of the adjoint operator. When $T^*$ is defined according to this formula, it is called the formal adjoint of T.

A (formally) self-adjoint operator is an operator equal to its own (formal) adjoint.

=== Several variables ===
If Ω is a domain in R^{n}, and P a differential operator on Ω, then the adjoint of P is defined in L^{2}(Ω) by duality in the analogous manner:

$$\langle f, P^* g\rangle_{L^2(\Omega)} = \langle P f, g\rangle_{L^2(\Omega)}$$

for all smooth L^{2} functions f, g. Since smooth functions are dense in L^{2}, this defines the adjoint on a dense subset of L^{2}: P^{*} is a densely defined operator.

=== Example ===
The Sturm–Liouville operator is a well-known example of a formal self-adjoint operator. This second-order linear differential operator L can be written in the form

$$Lu = -(pu')'+qu=-(pu''+p'u')+qu=-pu''-p'u'+qu=(-p) D^2 u +(-p') D u + (q)u.$$

This property can be proven using the formal adjoint definition above.

This operator is central to Sturm–Liouville theory where the eigenfunctions (analogues to eigenvectors) of this operator are considered.

== Properties ==
Differentiation is linear, i.e.

$$D(f+g) = (Df)+(Dg),$$
$$D(af) = a(Df),$$

where f and g are functions, and a is a constant.

Any polynomial in D with function coefficients is also a differential operator. We may also compose differential operators by the rule

$$(D_1 \circ D_2)(f) = D_1(D_2(f)).$$

Some care is then required: firstly any function coefficients in the operator D_{2} must be differentiable as many times as the application of D_{1} requires. To get a ring of such operators we must assume derivatives of all orders of the coefficients used. Secondly, this ring will not be commutative: an operator gD isn't the same in general as Dg. For example, we have the relation basic in quantum mechanics:

$$Dx - xD = 1.$$

The subring of operators that are polynomials in D with constant coefficients is, by contrast, commutative. It can be characterised another way: it consists of the translation-invariant operators.

The differential operators also obey the shift theorem.

== Ring of polynomial differential operators ==
=== Ring of univariate polynomial differential operators ===
If R is a ring, let $R\langle D,X \rangle$ be the non-commutative polynomial ring over R in the variables D and X, and I the two-sided ideal generated by DX − XD − 1. Then the ring of univariate polynomial differential operators over R is the quotient ring $R\langle D,X\rangle/I$. This is a non-commutative simple ring. Every element can be written in a unique way as a R-linear combination of monomials of the form $X^a D^b \text{ mod } I$. It supports an analogue of Euclidean division of polynomials.

Differential modules over $R[X]$ (for the standard derivation) can be identified with modules over $R\langle D,X\rangle/I$.

=== Ring of multivariate polynomial differential operators ===
If R is a ring, let $R\langle D_1,\ldots,D_n,X_1,\ldots,X_n\rangle$ be the non-commutative polynomial ring over R in the variables $D_1,\ldots,D_n,X_1,\ldots,X_n$, and I the two-sided ideal generated by the elements

$$(D_i X_j-X_j D_i)-\delta_{i,j},\ \ \ D_i D_j -D_j D_i,\ \ \ X_i X_j - X_j X_i$$

for all $1 \le i,j \le n,$ where $\delta$ is Kronecker delta. Then the ring of multivariate polynomial differential operators over R is the quotient ring $R\langle D_1,\ldots,D_n,X_1,\ldots,X_n\rangle/I$.

This is a non-commutative simple ring. Every element can be written in a unique way as a R-linear combination of monomials of the form $X_1^{a_1} \ldots X_n^{a_n} D_1^{b_1} \ldots D_n^{b_n}$.

== Coordinate-independent description ==
In differential geometry and algebraic geometry it is often convenient to have a coordinate-independent description of differential operators between two vector bundles. Let E and F be two vector bundles over a differentiable manifold M. An R-linear mapping of sections P : Γ(E) → Γ(F) is said to be a kth-order linear differential operator if it factors through the jet bundle J^{k}(E). In other words, there exists a linear mapping of vector bundles

$$i_P: J^k(E) \to F$$

such that

$$P = i_P\circ j^k$$

where j^{k}: Γ(E) → Γ(J^{k}(E)) is the prolongation that associates to any section of E its k-jet.

This just means that for a given section s of E, the value of P(s) at a point x ∈ M is fully determined by the kth-order infinitesimal behavior of s in x. In particular this implies that P(s)(x) is determined by the germ of s in x, which is expressed by saying that differential operators are local. A foundational result is the Peetre theorem showing that the converse is also true: any (linear) local operator is differential.

=== Relation to commutative algebra ===
An equivalent, but purely algebraic description of linear differential operators is as follows: an R-linear map P is a kth-order linear differential operator, if for any k + 1 smooth functions $f_0,\ldots,f_k \in C^\infty(M)$ we have

$$[f_k,[f_{k-1},[\cdots[f_0,P]\cdots]]=0.$$

Here the bracket $[f,P]:\Gamma(E)\to \Gamma(F)$ is defined as the commutator

$$[f,P](s)=P(f\cdot s)-f\cdot P(s).$$

This characterization of linear differential operators shows that they are particular mappings between modules over a commutative algebra, allowing the concept to be seen as a part of commutative algebra.

== Variants ==
=== A differential operator of infinite order ===
A differential operator of infinite order is (roughly) a differential operator whose total symbol is a power series instead of a polynomial.

=== Invariant differential operator ===
An invariant differential operator is a differential operator that is also an invariant operator (e.g., commutes with a group action).

=== Bidifferential operator ===
A differential operator acting on two functions $D(g,f)$ is called a bidifferential operator. The notion appears, for instance, in an associative algebra structure on a deformation quantization of a Poisson algebra.

=== Microdifferential operator ===
A microdifferential operator is a type of operator on an open subset of a cotangent bundle, as opposed to an open subset of a manifold. It is obtained by extending the notion of a differential operator to the cotangent bundle.

== See also ==
- Difference operator
- Delta operator
- Elliptic operator
- Curl (mathematics)
- Fractional calculus
- Differential calculus over commutative algebras
- Lagrangian system
- Spectral theory
- Energy operator
- Momentum operator
- Pseudo-differential operator
- Fundamental solution
- Atiyah–Singer index theorem (section on symbol of operator)
- Malgrange–Ehrenpreis theorem
- Hypoelliptic operator
