= Picard–Fuchs equation =

Mathematical equation

In mathematics, the Picard–Fuchs equation, named after Émile Picard and Lazarus Fuchs, is a linear ordinary differential equation whose solutions describe the periods of elliptic curves.

== Definition ==
Let

$$j=\frac{g_2^3}{g_2^3-27g_3^2}$$

be the j-invariant with $g_2$ and $g_3$ the modular invariants of the elliptic curve in Weierstrass form:

$$y^2=4x^3-g_2x-g_3.\,$$

Note that the j-invariant is an isomorphism from the Riemann surface $\mathbb{H}/\Gamma$ to the Riemann sphere $\mathbb{C}\cup\{\infty\}$; where $\mathbb{H}$ is the upper half-plane and $\Gamma$ is the modular group. The Picard–Fuchs equation is then

$$\frac{d^2y}{dj^2} + \frac{1}{j} \frac{dy}{dj} +
\frac{31j -4}{144j^2(1-j)^2} y=0.\,$$

Written in Q-form, one has

$$\frac{d^2f}{dj^2} +
\frac{1-1968j + 2654208j^2}{4j^2 (1-1728j)^2} f=0.\,$$

== Solutions ==
This equation can be cast into the form of the hypergeometric differential equation. It has two linearly independent solutions, called the periods of elliptic functions. The ratio of the two periods is equal to the period ratio τ, the standard coordinate on the upper-half plane. However, the ratio of two solutions of the hypergeometric equation is also known as a Schwarz triangle map.

The Picard–Fuchs equation can be cast into the form of Riemann's differential equation, and thus solutions can be directly read off in terms of Riemann P-functions. One has

$$y(j)=P  \left\{ \begin{matrix}
0 & 1 & \infty & \; \\
{1/6} & {1/4} & 0 & j \\
{-1/6\;} & {3/4} & 0 & \;
\end{matrix} \right\}\,$$

At least four methods to find the j-function inverse can be given.

Dedekind defines the j-function by its Schwarz derivative in his letter to Borchardt. As a partial fraction, it reveals the geometry of the fundamental domain:

$$2(S\tau)
(j) = \frac{1-\frac{1}{4}}{(1-j)^2} + \frac{1-\frac{1}{9}}{j^2} + \frac{1-\frac{1}{4}-\frac{1}{9}}{j(1-j)} = \frac{3}{4(1-j)^2} + \frac{8}{9j^2} + \frac{23}{36j(1-j)}$$

where (Sƒ)(x) is the Schwarzian derivative of ƒ with respect to x.

== Generalization ==
In algebraic geometry, this equation has been shown to be a very special case of a general phenomenon, the Gauss–Manin connection.
