= Grothendieck–Katz p-curvature conjecture =

In mathematics, the Grothendieck–Katz p-curvature conjecture is a local-global principle for linear ordinary differential equations, related to differential Galois theory and in a loose sense analogous to the result in the Chebotarev density theorem considered as the polynomial case. It is a conjecture of Alexander Grothendieck from the late 1960s, and apparently not published by him in any form.

The general case remains unsolved, despite recent progress; it has been linked to geometric investigations involving algebraic foliations.

== Formulation ==
In a simplest possible statement the conjecture can be stated in its essentials for a vector system written as

$$dv/dz = A(z)v$$

for a vector v of size n, and an n-by-n matrix A of algebraic functions with algebraic number coefficients. The question is to give a criterion for when there is a full set of algebraic function solutions, meaning a fundamental matrix (i.e. n vector solutions put into a block matrix). For example, a classical question was for the hypergeometric equation: when does it have a pair of algebraic solutions, in terms of its parameters? The answer is known classically as Schwarz's list. In monodromy terms, the question is of identifying the cases of finite monodromy group.

By reformulation and passing to a larger system, the essential case is for rational functions in A and rational number coefficients. Then a necessary condition is that for almost all prime numbers p, the system defined by reduction modulo p should also have a full set of algebraic solutions, over the finite field with p elements.

Grothendieck's conjecture is that these necessary conditions, for almost all p, should be sufficient. The connection with p-curvature is that the mod p condition stated is the same as saying the p-curvature, formed by a recurrence operation on A, is zero; so another way to say it is that p-curvature of 0 for almost all p implies enough algebraic solutions of the original equation.

== Katz's formulation for the Galois group ==
Nicholas Katz has applied Tannakian category techniques to show that this conjecture is essentially the same as saying that the differential Galois group G (or strictly speaking the Lie algebra g of the algebraic group G, which in this case is the Zariski closure of the monodromy group) can be determined by mod p information, for a certain wide class of differential equations.

== Progress ==
A wide class of cases has been proved by Benson Farb and Mark Kisin; these equations are on a locally symmetric variety X subject to some group-theoretic conditions. This work is based on the previous results of Katz for Picard–Fuchs equations (in the contemporary sense of the Gauss–Manin connection), as amplified in the Tannakian direction by André. It also applies a version of superrigidity particular to arithmetic groups. Other progress has been by arithmetic methods.

== History ==
Nicholas Katz related some cases to deformation theory in 1972, in a paper where the conjecture was published. Since then, reformulations have been published. A q-analogue for difference equations has been proposed.

In responding to Kisin's talk on this work at the 2009 Colloque Grothendieck, Katz gave a brief account from personal knowledge of the genesis of the conjecture. Grothendieck put it forth in public discussion in Spring 1969, but wrote nothing on the topic. He was led to the idea by foundational intuitions in the area of crystalline cohomology, at that time being developed by his student Pierre Berthelot. In some way wishing to equate the notion of "nilpotence" in the theory of connections, with the divided power structure technique that became standard in crystalline theory, Grothendieck produced the conjecture as a by-product.
