= John Dougall (mathematician) =

Scottish mathematician (1867–1960)

Dr. John Dougall FRSE (June 1867 – 24 February 1960) was "one of Scotland's leading mathematicians". Two formulas are named Dougall's formula after him: one for the sum of a _{7}F_{6} hypergeometric series, and another for the sum of a bilateral hypergeometric series.

== Life ==
Dougall was born in June 1867 in Kippen, a small village near Stirling, Scotland; his father, a watchmaker and postmaster, had nine children, among whom John was the eldest.

He was educated locally at Kippen School. He left school at age 13 to become a post office worker, but a year later entered Glasgow University, from which he earned an M.A. in 1886. (He was later given a doctorate by the same university.) After graduating, he taught mathematics at the Glasgow and West of Scotland Technical College before becoming an editor and translator of mathematical publications for Blackie and Son, a Glasgow publisher. He died on 24 February 1960 in Glasgow.

Dougall became a member of the Edinburgh Mathematical Society in 1885, and was president of the society for 1925–1926. He won the Makdougall-Brisbane Prize of the Royal Society of Edinburgh for 1902–1904, and was elected a Fellow of the Society in 1921. His proposers were George Alexander Gibson, Sir Edmund Taylor Whittaker, Cargill Gilston Knott, and James Gordon Gray.

He frequently published mathematical works in the proceedings and transactions of these two societies. He was also an honorary president of the Glasgow Mathematical Association, and in 1936 he followed Albert Einstein as Gibson Lecturer at Glasgow University.

At Blackie and Son, Dougall oversaw the publication of many advanced mathematics books, not only from English authors but also translations from writings in German and Italian by Richard Courant, Konrad Knopp, Tullio Levi-Civita, Vito Volterra, and others. Dougall's own contributions to mathematics include works on Bessel functions, Mathieu functions, hypergeometric series, and the Schläfli double six. He also made contributions to the theory of elasticity, for which he won the Makdougall-Brisbane Prize.

He died at home, 47 Airthrey Avenue in Glasgow on 25 February 1960.

== Publications ==
Dougall translated Max Born's critical book Atomic Physics, and Émile Borel's Space and Time into English
