= Dougall's formula =

Dougall's formula may refer to one of two formulas for hypergeometric series, both named after John Dougall:

- Dougall's formula for the sum of a _{7}F_{6} hypergeometric series
- Dougall's formula for the sum of a bilateral hypergeometric series
