= Schwarz triangle function =

Conformal mappings in complex analysis

The upper half-plane, and the image of the upper half-plane transformed by the Schwarz triangle function with various parameters.

In complex analysis, the Schwarz triangle function or Schwarz s-function is a function that conformally maps the upper half plane to a triangle in the upper half plane having lines or circular arcs for edges. The target triangle is not necessarily a Schwarz triangle, although that is the most mathematically interesting case. When that triangle is a non-overlapping Schwarz triangle, i.e. a Möbius triangle, the inverse of the Schwarz triangle function is a single-valued automorphic function for that triangle's triangle group. More specifically, it is a modular function.

== Formula ==
Let πα, πβ, and πγ be the interior angles at the vertices of the triangle in radians. Each of α, β, and γ may take values between 0 and 1 inclusive. Following Nehari, these angles are in clockwise order, with the vertex having angle πα at the origin and the vertex having angle πγ lying on the real line. The Schwarz triangle function can be given in terms of hypergeometric functions as:

$$s(\alpha, \beta, \gamma; z) = z^{\alpha} \frac{_2 F_1 \left(a', b'; c'; z\right)}{_2 F_1 \left(a, b; c; z\right)}$$

where

a = (1−α−β−γ)/2,
b = (1−α+β−γ)/2,
c = 1−α,
a′ = a − c + 1 = (1+α−β−γ)/2,
b′ = b − c + 1 = (1+α+β−γ)/2, and
c′ = 2 − c = 1 + α.

This function maps the upper half-plane to a spherical triangle if α + β + γ > 1, or a hyperbolic triangle if α + β + γ < 1. When α + β + γ = 1, then the triangle is a Euclidean triangle with straight edges: a = 0, $_2 F_1 \left(a, b; c; z\right) = 1$, and the formula reduces to that given by the Schwarz–Christoffel transformation.

=== Derivation ===
Through the theory of complex ordinary differential equations with regular singular points and the Schwarzian derivative, the triangle function can be expressed as the quotient of two solutions of a hypergeometric differential equation with real coefficients and singular points at 0, 1 and ∞. By the Schwarz reflection principle, the reflection group induces an action on the two dimensional space of solutions. On the orientation-preserving normal subgroup, this two-dimensional representation corresponds to the monodromy of the ordinary differential equation and induces a group of Möbius transformations on quotients of hypergeometric functions.

== Singular points ==
This mapping has regular singular points at z = 0, 1, and ∞, corresponding to the vertices of the triangle with angles πα, πγ, and πβ respectively. At these singular points,

$$\begin{align}
s(0) &= 0, \\[4mu]
s(1) &= \frac
{\Gamma(1-a')\Gamma(1-b')\Gamma(c')}
{\Gamma(1-a)\Gamma(1-b)\Gamma(c)}, \\[8mu]
s(\infty) &= \exp\left(i \pi \alpha \right)\frac
{\Gamma(1-a')\Gamma(b)\Gamma(c')}
{\Gamma(1-a)\Gamma(b')\Gamma(c)},
\end{align}$$

where $\Gamma(x)$ is the gamma function.

Near each singular point, the function may be approximated as

$$\begin{align}
s_0(z) &= z^\alpha (1+O(z)), \\[6mu]
s_1(z) &= (1-z)^\gamma (1+O(1-z)), \\[6mu]
s_\infty(z) &= z^\beta (1+O(1/z)),
\end{align}$$

where $O(x)$ is big O notation.

== Inverse ==
When α, β, and γ are rational, the triangle is a Schwarz triangle. When each of α, β, and γ are either the reciprocal of an integer or zero, the triangle is a Möbius triangle, i.e. a non-overlapping Schwarz triangle. For a Möbius triangle, the inverse is a modular function.

In the spherical case, that modular function is a rational function. For Euclidean triangles, the inverse can be expressed using elliptical functions.

== Ideal triangles ==
When α = 0 the triangle is degenerate, lying entirely on the real line. If either of β or γ are non-zero, the angles can be permuted so that the positive value is α, but that is not an option for an ideal triangle having all angles zero.

Instead, a mapping to an ideal triangle with vertices at 0, 1, and ∞ is given by in terms of the complete elliptic integral of the first kind:

$$i\frac{K(1-z)}{K(z)}$$.

This expression is the inverse of the modular lambda function.

== Extensions ==
The Schwarz–Christoffel transformation gives the mapping from the upper half-plane to any Euclidean polygon.

The methodology used to derive the Schwarz triangle function earlier can be applied more generally to arc-edged polygons. However, for an n-sided polygon, the solution has n − 3 additional parameters, which are difficult to determine in practice. See Schwarzian derivative § Conformal mapping of circular arc polygons for more details.

== Applications ==
L. P. Lee used Schwarz triangle functions to derive conformal map projections onto polyhedral surfaces.

== Sources ==
- Ahlfors, Lars V. (1979). Complex analysis: an introduction to the theory of analytic functions of one complex variable (3 ed.). New York: McGraw-Hill. ISBN 0-07-000657-1. OCLC 4036464.
- Carathéodory, Constantin (1954). Theory of functions of a complex variable. Vol. 2. Translated by F. Steinhardt. Chelsea. OCLC 926250115.
- Hille, Einar (1997). Ordinary differential equations in the complex domain. Mineola, N.Y.: Dover Publications. ISBN 0-486-69620-0. OCLC 36225146.
- Nehari, Zeev (1975). Conformal mapping. New York: Dover Publications. ISBN 0-486-61137-X. OCLC 1504503.
- Sansone, Giovanni; Gerretsen, Johan (1969). Lectures on the theory of functions of a complex variable. II: Geometric theory. Wolters-Noordhoff. OCLC 245996162.
