= Gauss–Manin connection =

Connection on a vector bundle

In mathematics, the Gauss–Manin connection is a connection on a certain vector bundle over a base space S of a family of algebraic varieties $V_s$. The fibers of the vector bundle are the de Rham cohomology groups $H^k_{\mathrm{dR}}(V_s)$ of the fibers $V_s$ of the family. It was introduced by Yuri Manin (1958) for curves S and by Alexander Grothendieck (1966) in higher dimensions.

Flat sections of the bundle are described by differential equations; the best-known of these is the Picard–Fuchs equation, which arises when the family of varieties is taken to be the family of elliptic curves. In intuitive terms, when the family is locally trivial, cohomology classes can be moved from one fiber in the family to nearby fibers, providing the 'flat section' concept in purely topological terms. The existence of the connection is to be inferred from the flat sections.

== Intuition ==
Consider a smooth morphism of schemes $X\to B$ over characteristic 0. If we consider these spaces as complex analytic spaces, then the Ehresmann fibration theorem tells us that each fiber $X_b = f^{-1}(b)$ is a smooth manifold and each fiber is diffeomorphic. This tells us that the de-Rham cohomology groups $H^k(X_b)$ are all isomorphic. We can use this observation to ask what happens when we try to differentiate cohomology classes using vector fields from the base space $B$.

Consider a cohomology class $\alpha \in H^k(X)$ such that $i^*_b(\alpha) \in H^k(X_b)$ where $i_b\colon X_b \to X$ is the inclusion map. Then, if we consider the classes

$$\left[ i_b^\ast \left(\frac{\partial^{i_1+\cdots+i_n} \alpha}{\partial b_1^{i_1} \cdots \partial b_n^{i_n} } \right)\right] \in H^k(X_b)$$

eventually there will be a relation between them, called the Picard–Fuchs equation. The Gauss–Manin connection is a tool which encodes this information into a connection on the flat vector bundle on $B$ constructed from the $H^k(X_b)$.

== Example ==
A commonly cited example is the Dwork construction of the Picard–Fuchs equation. Let

$V_\lambda(x,y,z)$ be the elliptic curve $x^3+y^3+z^3 - \lambda xyz=0 \;$.

Here, $\lambda$ is a free parameter describing the curve; it is an element of the complex projective line (the family of hypersurfaces in $n-1$ dimensions of degree n, defined analogously, has been intensively studied in recent years, in connection with the modularity theorem and its extensions). Thus, the base space of the bundle is taken to be the projective line. For a fixed $\lambda$ in the base space, consider an element $\omega_\lambda$ of the associated de Rham cohomology group

$$\omega_\lambda \in H^1_{\mathrm{dR}}(V_\lambda).$$

Each such element corresponds to a period of the elliptic curve. The cohomology is two-dimensional. The Gauss–Manin connection corresponds to the second-order differential equation

$$(\lambda^3-27) \frac{\partial^2 \omega_\lambda}{\partial \lambda^2}
+3\lambda^2 \frac{\partial \omega_\lambda}{\partial \lambda}  + \lambda \omega_\lambda =0.$$

== D-module explanation ==
In the more abstract setting of D-module theory, the existence of such equations is subsumed in a general discussion of the direct image.

== Equations "arising from geometry" ==
The whole class of Gauss–Manin connections has been used to try to formulate the concept of differential equations that "arise from geometry". In connection with the Grothendieck p-curvature conjecture, Nicholas Katz proved that the class of Gauss–Manin connections with algebraic number coefficients satisfies the conjecture. This result is directly connected with the Siegel G-function concept of transcendental number theory, for meromorphic function solutions. The Bombieri–Dwork conjecture, also attributed to Yves André, which is given in more than one version, postulates a converse direction: solutions as G-functions, or p-curvature nilpotent mod p for almost all primes p, means an equation "arises from geometry".

== See also ==
- Mirror symmetry conjecture
- Mixed Hodge module
- Meromorphic connection
