= Fuchs's theorem =

Mathematical theorem

In mathematics, Fuchs's theorem, named after Lazarus Fuchs, states that a second-order differential equation of the form $y'' + p(x)y' + q(x)y = g(x)$ has a solution expressible by a generalised Frobenius series when $p(x)$, $q(x)$ and $g(x)$ are analytic at $x = a$ or $a$ is a regular singular point. That is, any solution to this second-order differential equation can be written as $y = \sum_{n=0}^\infty a_n (x - a)^{n + s}, \quad a_0 \neq 0$ for some positive real s, or $y = y_0 \ln(x - a) + \sum_{n=0}^\infty b_n(x - a)^{n + r}, \quad b_0 \neq 0$ for some positive real r, where y_{0} is a solution of the first kind.

Its radius of convergence is at least as large as the minimum of the radii of convergence of $p(x)$, $q(x)$ and $g(x)$.

== See also ==
- Frobenius method
