= QDF =

QDF may stand for:

- .qdf, a data file extension used by Quicken personal finance software for Windows
- Quadratic Differential Form, in mathematics
