= Fuchsian theory =

The Fuchsian theory of linear differential equations, which is named after Lazarus Immanuel Fuchs, provides a characterization of various types of singularities and the relations among them.

At any ordinary point of a homogeneous linear differential equation of order $n$ there exists a fundamental system of $n$ linearly independent power series solutions. A non-ordinary point is called a singularity. At a singularity the maximal number of linearly independent power series solutions may be less than the order of the differential equation.

== Generalized series solutions ==
The generalized series at $\xi\in\mathbb{C}$ is defined by

$$(z-\xi)^\alpha\sum_{k=0}^\infty c_k(z-\xi)^k, \text{ with } \alpha,c_k \in \mathbb{C} \text{ and } c_0\neq0,$$

which is known as Frobenius series, due to the connection with the Frobenius series method. Frobenius series solutions are formal solutions of differential equations. The formal derivative of $z^\alpha$, with $\alpha\in\mathbb{C}$, is defined such that $(z^\alpha)'=\alpha z^{\alpha-1}$. Let $f$ denote a Frobenius series relative to $\xi$, then

$${d^nf \over d z^n} = (z-\xi)^{\alpha-n}\sum_{k=0}^\infty (\alpha+k)^{\underline{n}} c_k(z-\xi)^k,$$

where $\alpha^{\underline{n}}:=\prod_{i=0}^{n-1}(\alpha-i) = \alpha(\alpha-1)\cdots(\alpha-n+1)$ denotes the falling factorial notation.

== Indicial equation ==
Let $f:=(z-\xi)^{\alpha}\sum_{k=0}^{\infty}c_k(z-\xi)^k$ be a Frobenius series relative to $\xi \in \mathbb{C}$. Let $Lf=f^{(n)} + q_1f^{(n-1)} + \cdots + q_nf$ be a linear differential operator of order $n$ with one valued coefficient functions $q_1, \dots, q_n$. Let all coefficients $q_1,\dots,q_n$ be expandable as Laurent series with finite principle part at $\xi$. Then there exists a smallest $N\in\mathbb{N}$ such that $(z-\xi)^Nq_i$ is a power series for all $i\in\{1,\dots, n\}$. Hence, $Lf$ is a Frobenius series of the form $Lf=(z-\xi)^{\alpha-n-N}\psi(z)$, with a certain power series $\psi(z)$ in $(z-\xi)$. The indicial polynomial is defined by $P_{\xi}:=\psi(0)$ which is a polynomial in $\alpha$, i.e., $P_{\xi}$ equals the coefficient of $Lf$ with lowest degree in $(z-\xi)$. For each formal Frobenius series solution $f$ of $Lf=0$, $\alpha$ must be a root of the indicial polynomial at $\xi$, i. e., $\alpha$ needs to solve the indicial equation $P_{\xi}(\alpha) = 0$.

If $\xi$ is an ordinary point, the resulting indicial equation is given by $\alpha^{\underline{n}}=0$. If $\xi$ is a regular singularity, then $\deg(P_{\xi}(\alpha))=n$ and if $\xi$ is an irregular singularity, $\deg(P_{\xi}(\alpha))<n$ holds. This is illustrated by the later examples. The indicial equation relative to $\xi=\infty$ is defined by the indicial equation of $\widetilde{L}f$, where $\widetilde{L}$ denotes the differential operator $L$ transformed by $z=x^{-1}$which is a linear differential operator in $x$, at $x=0$.

=== Example: Regular singularity ===
The differential operator of order $2$, $Lf := f''+\frac{1}{z}f'+\frac{1}{z^2}f$, has a regular singularity at $z=0$. Consider a Frobenius series solution relative to $0$, $f := z^\alpha(c_0 + c_1z + c_2 z^2 + \cdots)$ with $c_0\neq0$.

$$\begin{align}
Lf & = z^{\alpha-2}(\alpha(\alpha-1)c_0 + \cdots) + \frac{1}{z}z^{\alpha-1}(\alpha c_0 + \cdots) + \frac{1}{z^2}z^{\alpha}(c_0 + \cdots) \\[5pt]
& = z^{\alpha-2}c_0(\alpha(\alpha-1) + \alpha + 1) + \cdots.
\end{align}$$

This implies that the degree of the indicial polynomial relative to $0$ is equal to the order of the differential equation, $\deg(P_0(\alpha)) = \deg(\alpha^2 + 1) = 2$.

=== Example: Irregular singularity ===
The differential operator of order $2$, $Lf:=f''+\frac{1}{z^2}f' + f$, has an irregular singularity at $z=0$. Let $f$ be a Frobenius series solution relative to $0$.

$$\begin{align}
Lf & = z^{\alpha-2}(\alpha(\alpha-1)c_0 + \cdots) + \frac{1}{z^2}z^{\alpha-1}(\alpha c_0 + (\alpha+1)c_1 z + \cdots) + z^{\alpha}(c_0 + \cdots) \\[5pt]
& = z^{\alpha-3} c_0 \alpha + z^{\alpha-2}(c_0\alpha(\alpha-1) + c_1(\alpha+1)) + \cdots.
\end{align}$$

Certainly, at least one coefficient of the lower derivatives pushes the exponent of $z$ down. Inevitably, the coefficient of a lower derivative is of smallest exponent. The degree of the indicial polynomial relative to $0$ is less than the order of the differential equation, $\deg(P_0(\alpha)) = \deg(\alpha) = 1 < 2$.

== Formal fundamental systems ==
We have given a homogeneous linear differential equation $Lf=0$ of order $n$ with coefficients that are expandable as Laurent series with finite principle part. The goal is to obtain a fundamental set of formal Frobenius series solutions relative to any point $\xi\in\mathbb{C}$. This can be done by the Frobenius series method, which says: The starting exponents are given by the solutions of the indicial equation and the coefficients describe a polynomial recursion. W.l.o.g., assume $\xi=0$.

=== Fundamental system at ordinary point ===
If $0$ is an ordinary point, a fundamental system is formed by the $n$ linearly independent formal Frobenius series solutions $\psi_1, z\psi_2, \dots, z^{n-1}\psi_{n}$, where $\psi_i\in\mathbb{C}[[z]]$ denotes a formal power series in $z$ with $\psi(0)\neq0$, for $i\in\{1,\dots,n\}$. Due to the reason that the starting exponents are integers, the Frobenius series are power series.

=== Fundamental system at regular singularity ===
If $0$ is a regular singularity, one has to pay attention to roots of the indicial polynomial that differ by integers. In this case the recursive calculation of the Frobenius series' coefficients stops for some roots and the Frobenius series method does not give an $n$-dimensional solution space. The following can be shown independent of the distance between roots of the indicial polynomial: Let $\alpha\in\mathbb{C}$ be a $\mu$-fold root of the indicial polynomial relative to $0$. Then the part of the fundamental system corresponding to $\alpha$ is given by the $\mu$ linearly independent formal solutions

$$\begin{align}
& z^\alpha \psi_0 \\
& z^\alpha \psi_1 + z^\alpha\log(z)\psi_0\\
& z^\alpha \psi_2 + 2z^\alpha\log(z)\psi_1 + z^\alpha\log^2(z)\psi_0\\
& \qquad \vdots\\
& z^\alpha \psi_{\mu-1} + \cdots + \binom{\mu-1}{k} z^{\alpha}\log^k(z)\psi_{\mu-k} + \cdots + z^\alpha \log^{\mu-1}(z)\psi_0
\end{align}$$

where $\psi_i\in\mathbb{C}[[z]]$ denotes a formal power series in $z$ with $\psi(0)\neq0$, for $i\in\{0,\dots,\mu-1\}$. One obtains a fundamental set of $n$ linearly independent formal solutions, because the indicial polynomial relative to a regular singularity is of degree $n$.

=== General result ===
One can show that a linear differential equation of order $n$ always has $n$ linearly independent solutions of the form

$$\exp(u(z^{-1/s}))\cdot z^\alpha(\psi_0(z^{1/s}) + \cdots + \log^k(z) \psi_k(z^{1/s}) + \cdots + \log^{w}(z) \psi_w(z^{1/s}))$$

where $s\in\mathbb{N}\setminus\{0\}, u(z)\in\mathbb{C}[z]$ and $u(0)=0, \alpha\in\mathbb{C}, w\in\mathbb{N}$, and the formal power series $\psi_0(z),\dots,\psi_w\in\mathbb{C}[[z]]$.

$0$ is an irregular singularity if and only if there is a solution with $u\neq 0$. Hence, a differential equation is of Fuchsian type if and only if for all $\xi\in\mathbb{C}\cup\{\infty\}$ there exists a fundamental system of Frobenius series solutions with $u=0$ at $\xi$.
