= Riemann's differential equation =

Generalization of the hypergeometric differential equation

In mathematics, Riemann's differential equation, named after Bernhard Riemann, is a generalization of the hypergeometric differential equation, allowing the regular singular points to occur anywhere on the Riemann sphere, rather than merely at 0, 1, and $\infty$. The equation is also known as the Papperitz equation.

The hypergeometric differential equation is a second-order linear differential equation which has three regular singular points, 0, 1 and $\infty$. That equation admits two linearly independent solutions; near a singularity $z_s$, the solutions take the form $x^s f(x)$, where $x = z-z_s$ is a local variable, and $f$ is locally holomorphic with $f(0)\neq0$. The real number $s$ is called the exponent of the solution at $z_s$. Let α, β and γ be the exponents of one solution at 0, 1 and $\infty$ respectively; and let α′, β′ and γ′ be those of the other. Then

$$\alpha + \alpha' + \beta + \beta' + \gamma + \gamma' = 1.$$

By applying suitable changes of variable, it is possible to transform the hypergeometric equation: Applying Möbius transformations will adjust the positions of the regular singular points, while other transformations (see below) can change the exponents at the regular singular points, subject to the exponents adding up to 1.

== Definition ==
The differential equation is given by

$\frac{d^2w}{dz^2} + \left[ \frac{1-\alpha-\alpha'}{z-a} + \frac{1-\beta-\beta'}{z-b} + \frac{1-\gamma-\gamma'}{z-c} \right] \frac{dw}{dz}$

$$+\left[
\frac{\alpha\alpha' (a-b)(a-c)} {z-a}
+\frac{\beta\beta' (b-c)(b-a)} {z-b}
+\frac{\gamma\gamma' (c-a)(c-b)} {z-c}
\right]
\frac{w}{(z-a)(z-b)(z-c)}=0.$$

The regular singular points are a, b, and c. The exponents of the solutions at these regular singular points are, respectively, α; α′, β; β′, and γ; γ′. As before, the exponents are subject to the condition

$$\alpha+\alpha'+\beta+\beta'+\gamma+\gamma'=1.$$

== Solutions and relationship with the hypergeometric function ==
The solutions are denoted by the Riemann P-symbol (also known as the Papperitz symbol)

$$w(z)=P  \left\{ \begin{matrix} a & b & c & \; \\
\alpha & \beta & \gamma & z \\
\alpha' & \beta' & \gamma' & \;
\end{matrix} \right\}$$

The standard hypergeometric function may be expressed as

$$\;_2F_1(a,b;c;z) =
P  \left\{ \begin{matrix} 0 & \infty & 1 & \; \\
0 & a & 0 & z \\
1-c & b & c-a-b & \;
\end{matrix} \right\}$$

The P-functions obey a number of identities; one of them allows a general P-function to be expressed in terms of the hypergeometric function. It is

$$P  \left\{ \begin{matrix} a & b & c & \; \\
\alpha & \beta & \gamma & z \\
\alpha' & \beta' & \gamma' & \;
\end{matrix} \right\} =
\left(\frac{z-a}{z-b}\right)^\alpha
\left(\frac{z-c}{z-b}\right)^\gamma
P \left\{ \begin{matrix} 0 & \infty & 1 & \; \\
0 & \alpha+\beta+\gamma & 0 & \;\frac{(z-a)(c-b)}{(z-b)(c-a)} \\
\alpha'-\alpha & \alpha+\beta'+\gamma & \gamma'-\gamma & \;
\end{matrix} \right\}$$

In other words, one may write the solutions in terms of the hypergeometric function as

$$w(z)=
\left(\frac{z-a}{z-b}\right)^\alpha
\left(\frac{z-c}{z-b}\right)^\gamma
\;_2F_1 \left(
\alpha+\beta +\gamma,
\alpha+\beta'+\gamma;
1+\alpha-\alpha';
\frac{(z-a)(c-b)}{(z-b)(c-a)} \right)$$

The full complement of Kummer's 24 solutions may be obtained in this way; see the article hypergeometric differential equation for a treatment of Kummer's solutions.

== Fractional linear transformations ==
The P-function possesses a simple symmetry under the action of fractional linear transformations known as Möbius transformations (that are the conformal remappings of the Riemann sphere), or equivalently, under the action of the group GL(2, C). Given arbitrary complex numbers A, B, C, D such that AD − BC ≠ 0, define the quantities

$$u=\frac{Az+B}{Cz+D}
\quad \text{ and } \quad
\eta=\frac{Aa+B}{Ca+D}$$

and

$$\zeta=\frac{Ab+B}{Cb+D}
\quad \text{ and } \quad
\theta=\frac{Ac+B}{Cc+D}$$

then one has the simple relation

$$P  \left\{ \begin{matrix} a & b & c & \; \\
\alpha & \beta & \gamma & z \\
\alpha' & \beta' & \gamma' & \;
\end{matrix} \right\}
=P  \left\{ \begin{matrix}
\eta & \zeta & \theta & \; \\
\alpha & \beta & \gamma & u \\
\alpha' & \beta' & \gamma' & \;
\end{matrix} \right\}$$

expressing the symmetry.

== Exponents ==
If the Moebius transformation above moves the singular points but does not change the exponents, the following transformation does not move the singular points but changes the exponents:

$$\left(\frac{z-a}{z-b}\right)^k\left(\frac{z-c}{z-b}\right)^l P  \left\{ \begin{matrix} a & b & c & \; \\
\alpha & \beta  & \gamma & z \\
\alpha' & \beta' & \gamma' & \;
\end{matrix} \right\}
=P  \left\{ \begin{matrix}
a & b & c & \; \\
\alpha +k & \beta -k -l & \gamma + l & z \\
\alpha' +k & \beta'-k -l & \gamma' + l & \;
\end{matrix} \right\}$$

== See also ==
- Method of Frobenius
- Monodromy
