= Fuchs relation =

In mathematics, the Fuchs relation is a relation between the starting exponents of formal series solutions of certain linear differential equations, so called Fuchsian equations. It is named after Lazarus Immanuel Fuchs.

== Definition Fuchsian equation ==
A linear differential equation in which every singular point, including the point at infinity, is a regular singularity is called Fuchsian equation or equation of Fuchsian type. For Fuchsian equations a formal fundamental system exists at any point, due to the Fuchsian theory.

=== Coefficients of a Fuchsian equation ===
Let $a_1, \dots, a_r \in \mathbb{C}$ be the $r$ regular singularities in the finite part of the complex plane of the linear differential equation$Lf := \frac{d^nf}{dz^n} + q_1\frac{d^{n-1}f}{dz^{n-1}} + \cdots + q_{n-1}\frac{df}{dz} + q_nf$

with meromorphic functions $q_i$. For linear differential equations the singularities are exactly the singular points of the coefficients. $Lf=0$ is a Fuchsian equation if and only if the coefficients are rational functions of the form

$$q_i(z) = \frac{Q_i(z)}{\psi^i}$$

with the polynomial $\psi := \prod_{j=0}^r (z-a_j) \in\mathbb{C}[z]$ and certain polynomials $Q_i \in \mathbb{C}[z]$ for $i\in \{1,\dots,n\}$, such that $\deg(Q_i) \leq i(r-1)$. This means the coefficient $q_i$ has poles of order at most $i$, for $i\in \{1,\dots,n\}$.

== Fuchs relation ==
Let $Lf=0$ be a Fuchsian equation of order $n$ with the singularities $a_1, \dots, a_r\in\mathbb{C}$ and the point at infinity. Let $\alpha_{i1},\dots,\alpha_{in}\in\mathbb{C}$ be the roots of the indicial polynomial relative to $a_i$, for $i\in\{1,\dots,r\}$. Let $\beta_1,\dots,\beta_n\in\mathbb{C}$ be the roots of the indicial polynomial relative to $\infty$, which is given by the indicial polynomial of $Lf$ transformed by $z=x^{-1}$ at $x=0$. Then the so called Fuchs relation holds:

$\sum_{i=1}^r \sum_{k=1}^n \alpha_{ik} + \sum_{k=1}^n \beta_{k} = \frac{n(n-1)(r-1)}{2}$.

The Fuchs relation can be rewritten as infinite sum. Let $P_{\xi}$ denote the indicial polynomial relative to $\xi\in\mathbb{C}\cup\{\infty\}$ of the Fuchsian equation $Lf=0$. Define $\operatorname{defect}: \mathbb{C}\cup\{\infty\}\to\mathbb{C}$ as

$$\operatorname{defect}(\xi):=
\begin{cases}
\operatorname{Tr}(P_\xi) - \frac{n(n-1)}{2}\text{, for }\xi\in\mathbb{C}\\
\operatorname{Tr}(P_\xi) + \frac{n(n-1)}{2}\text{, for }\xi=\infty
\end{cases}$$

where $\operatorname{Tr}(P):=\sum_{\{z\in\mathbb{C}: P(z)=0\}} z$ gives the trace of a polynomial $P$, i. e., $\operatorname{Tr}$ denotes the sum of a polynomial's roots counted with multiplicity.

This means that $\operatorname{defect}(\xi)=0$ for any ordinary point $\xi$, due to the fact that the indicial polynomial relative to any ordinary point is $P_\xi(\alpha)= \alpha(\alpha-1)\cdots(\alpha-n+1)$. The transformation $z=x^{-1}$, that is used to obtain the indicial equation relative to $\infty$, motivates the changed sign in the definition of $\operatorname{defect}$ for $\xi=\infty$. The rewritten Fuchs relation is:

$\sum_{\xi\in\mathbb{C}\cup\{\infty\}} \operatorname{defect}(\xi) = 0.$
