= Schwarzian derivative =

Nonlinear differential operator used to study conformal mappings

In mathematics, the Schwarzian derivative is an operator similar to the derivative which is invariant under Möbius transformations. Thus, it occurs in the theory of the complex projective line, and in particular, in the theory of modular forms and hypergeometric functions. It plays an important role in the theory of univalent functions, conformal mapping and Teichmüller spaces. It is named after the German mathematician Hermann Schwarz.

== Definition ==
The Schwarzian derivative of a holomorphic function f of one complex variable z is defined by

$$(Sf)(z) = \left( \frac{f''(z)}{f'(z)}\right)' - \frac{1}{2}\left(\frac{f''(z)}{f'(z)}\right)^2
= \frac{f'''(z)}{f'(z)}-\frac{3}{2}\left(\frac{f''(z)}{f'(z)}\right)^2.$$

The same formula also defines the Schwarzian derivative of a C^{3} function of one real variable. The alternative notation

$$\{f,z\} = (Sf)(z)$$

is frequently used.

== Properties ==
The Schwarzian derivative of any Möbius transformation

$$g(z) = \frac{az + b}{cz + d}$$

is zero. Conversely, the Möbius transformations are the only functions with this property. Thus, the Schwarzian derivative precisely measures the degree to which a function fails to be a Möbius transformation.

If g is a Möbius transformation, then the composition $f \circ g$ has the same Schwarzian derivative as f; and on the other hand, the Schwarzian derivative of $f \circ g$ is given by the chain rule

$$(S(f \circ g))(z) = (Sf)(g(z)) \cdot g'(z)^2.$$

More generally, for any sufficiently differentiable functions f and g

$$S(f \circ g) = \left( (Sf)\circ g\right ) \cdot(g')^2 + Sg.$$

When f and g are smooth real-valued functions, this implies that all iterations of a function with negative (or positive) Schwarzian will remain negative (resp. positive), a fact of use in the study of one-dimensional dynamics.

Introducing the function of two complex variables

$$F(z,w)= \log \left ( \frac{f(z)-f(w)}{z-w} \right ),$$

its second mixed partial derivative is given by

$$\frac{\partial^2 F(z,w)}{\partial z \, \partial w} = {f^\prime(z)f^\prime(w)\over(f(z)-f(w))^2}-{1\over(z-w)^2},$$

and the Schwarzian derivative is given by the formula:

$$(Sf)(w)= \left. 6 \cdot {\partial^2 F(z,w)\over \partial z \, \partial w}\right\vert_{z=w}.$$

The Schwarzian derivative has a simple inversion formula, exchanging the dependent and the independent variables. One has

$$(Sw)(v) = -\left(\frac{dw}{dv}\right)^2 (Sv)(w)$$

or more explicitly, $Sf + (f')^2 ((Sf^{-1})\circ f) = 0$. This follows from the chain rule above.

== Geometric interpretation ==
William Thurston interprets the Schwarzian derivative as a measure of how much a conformal map deviates from a Möbius transformation. Let $f$ be a conformal mapping in a neighborhood of $z_0\in \mathbb C.$ Then there exists a unique Möbius transformation $M$ such that $M, f$ has the same 0, 1, 2-th order derivatives at $z_0.$

Now $(M^{-1} \circ f)(z) = z_0 + (z-z_0) + \tfrac16 a(z-z_0)^3 + \cdots.$ To explicitly solve for $a,$ it suffices to solve the case of $z_0 = 0.$ Let $M^{-1}(z) = (Az+B)/(Cz + 1),$ and solve for the $A, B, C$ that make the first three coefficients of $M^{-1}\circ f$ equal to $0, 1, 0.$ Plugging it into the fourth coefficient, we get $a = (Sf)(z_0)$.

Given
$$(M^{-1} \circ f)(z) = z_0 + (z-z_0) + \tfrac16 Sf(z_0) (z-z_0)^3 + \cdots$$
up to third order, this function maps the circle $z_0 + re^{i\theta}$ to the curve $z_0 + re^{i\theta}(1 + \tfrac16 Sf(z_0) r^2 e^{2i\theta})$. This is approximately an ellipse with semiaxes $r(1\pm \tfrac16 Sf(z_0) r^2)$. Since Möbius transformations always map circles to circles or lines, the Schwarzian derivative measures how much $f$ deviates from a Möbius transformation, in that it maps circles to non-circles.

=== Cross-ratio ===
Given a differentiable function $f$, it transforms the cross-ratio $(z_1, z_2; z_3, z_4) = \frac{(z_3 - z_1)(z_4 - z_2)}{(z_3 - z_2)(z_4 - z_1)}$. It is invariant under the Möbius transformation:
$$(z_1, z_2; z_3, z_4) = (f(z_1), f(z_2); f(z_3), f(z_4))$$
In general, if the 4 points are infinitesimally close, then it transforms according to
$$\frac{(f(z_1), f(z_2); f(z_3), f(z_4))}{(z_1, z_2; z_3, z_4)} = 1 + \frac 16 (Sf)(z) (z_1-z_2)(z_3-z_4) + O(dz^3)$$
in particular, it can be interpreted as a quadratic differential form. This immediately yields the chain rule
$$S(f \circ g) = \left( (Sf)\circ g\right ) \cdot(g')^2 + Sg.$$

== Differential equation ==
Consider the linear second-order ordinary differential equation
$$x''(t) + p(t) x(t) = 0$$
where $x$ is a real-valued function of a real parameter $t$. Let $X$ denote the two-dimensional space of solutions. For $t\in\mathbb R$, let $\operatorname{ev}_t: X \to \Reals$ be the evaluation functional $\operatorname{ev}_t(x) = x(t)$. The map $t \mapsto \operatorname{ker}(\operatorname{ev}_t)$ gives, for each point $t$ of the domain of $X$, a one-dimensional linear subspace of $X$. That is, the kernel defines a mapping from the real line to the real projective line. The Schwarzian of this mapping is well-defined, and in fact is equal to $2p(t)$ (Ovsienko & Tabachnikov 2005).

Owing to this interpretation of the Schwarzian, if two diffeomorphisms of a common open interval into $\mathbb{RP}^1$ have the same Schwarzian, then they are (locally) related by an element of the general linear group acting on the two-dimensional vector space of solutions to the same differential equation, i.e., a fractional linear transformation of $\mathbb{RP}^1$.

Alternatively, consider the second-order linear ordinary differential equation in the complex plane
$$\frac{d^2f}{dz^2}+ Q(z) f(z)=0.$$

Let $f_1(z)$ and $f_2(z)$ be two linearly independent holomorphic solutions. Then the ratio $g(z)=f_1(z)/f_2(z)$ satisfies

$$(Sg)(z) = 2Q(z)$$

over the domain on which $f_1(z)$ and $f_2(z)$ are defined, and $f_2(z) \ne 0.$ The converse is also true: if such a g exists, and it is holomorphic on a simply connected domain, then two solutions $f_1$ and $f_2$ can be found, and furthermore, these are unique up to a common scale factor.

When a linear second-order ordinary differential equation can be brought into the above form, the resulting Q is sometimes called the Q-value of the equation.

Note that the Gaussian hypergeometric differential equation can be brought into the above form, and thus pairs of solutions to the hypergeometric equation are related in this way.

== Conditions for univalence ==
If f is a holomorphic function on the unit disc, D, then W. Kraus (1932) and Nehari (1949) proved that a necessary condition for f to be univalent is

$$|S(f)| \le 6\left(1-|z|^2\right)^{-2}.$$

Conversely if f(z) is a holomorphic function on D satisfying

$$|S(f)(z)| \le 2\left(1-|z|^2\right)^{-2},$$

then Nehari proved that f is univalent.

In particular a sufficient condition for univalence is

$$|S(f)|\le 2.$$

== Conformal mapping of circular arc polygons ==
The Schwarzian derivative and associated second-order ordinary differential equation can be used to determine the unique conformal map between the upper half-plane or unit disk and any bounded polygon in the complex plane, the edges of which are circular arcs or straight lines. For polygons with straight edges, this reduces to the Schwarz–Christoffel mapping, which can be derived directly without using the Schwarzian derivative. The accessory parameters that arise as constants of integration are related to the eigenvalues of the second-order differential equation. Already in 1890 Felix Klein had studied the case of quadrilaterals in terms of the Lamé differential equation.

Let Δ be a circular arc polygon with angles $\pi\alpha_1, \ldots, \pi\alpha_n$ in clockwise order. Let f : H → Δ be a holomorphic map extending continuously to a map between the boundaries. Let the vertices correspond to points $a_1, \ldots, a_n$ on the real axis. Then p(x) = S(f)(x) is real-valued when x is real and different from all the points a_{i}. By the Schwarz reflection principle p(x) extends to a rational function on the complex plane with a double pole at a_{i}:

$$p(z) = \sum_{i=1}^n \frac{1 - \alpha_i^2}{2 \left(z - a_i\right)^2} + \frac{\beta_i}{z-a_i}.$$

The real numbers β_{i} are called accessory parameters. They are subject to three linear constraints:

$$\begin{align}
&\sum_i \beta_i = 0 \\
&\sum_i 2a_i \beta_i + \left ( 1 - \alpha_i^2 \right ) = 0 \\
&\sum_i a_i^2 \beta_i + a_i \left ( 1 - \alpha_i^2 \right ) = 0
\end{align}$$

which correspond to the vanishing of the coefficients of $z^{-1}, z^{-2}$ and $z^{-3}$ in the expansion of p(z) around z = ∞. The mapping f(z) can then be written as

$$f(z) = {u_1(z)\over u_2(z)},$$

where $u_1(z)$ and $u_2(z)$ are linearly independent holomorphic solutions of the linear second-order ordinary differential equation

$$u''(z) + \tfrac{1}{2} p(z) u(z) = 0.$$

There are n−3 linearly independent accessory parameters, which can be difficult to determine in practise.

For a triangle, when n = 3, there are no accessory parameters. The ordinary differential equation is equivalent to the hypergeometric differential equation and f(z) is the Schwarz triangle function, which can be written in terms of hypergeometric functions.

For a quadrilateral the accessory parameters depend on one independent variable λ. Writing U(z) = q(z)u(z) for a suitable choice of q(z), the ordinary differential equation takes the form

$$a(z) U''(z) + b(z) U'(z) + \left[c(z)+\lambda\right] U(z) = 0.$$

Thus $q(z) u_i(z)$ are eigenfunctions of a Sturm–Liouville equation on the interval $[a_i, a_{i+1}]$. By the Sturm separation theorem, the non-vanishing of $u_2(z)$ forces λ to be the lowest eigenvalue.

== Complex structure on Teichmüller space ==
Universal Teichmüller space is defined to be the space of real analytic quasiconformal mappings of the unit disc D, or equivalently the upper half-plane H, onto itself, with two mappings considered to be equivalent if on the boundary one is obtained from the other by composition with a Möbius transformation. Identifying D with the lower hemisphere of the Riemann sphere, any quasiconformal self-map f of the lower hemisphere corresponds naturally to a conformal mapping of the upper hemisphere $\tilde{f}$ onto itself. In fact $\tilde{f}$ is determined as the restriction to the upper hemisphere of the solution of the Beltrami differential equation

$$\frac{\partial F}{\partial \bar{z}} = \mu(z) \frac{\partial F}{\partial z},$$

where μ is the bounded measurable function defined by

$$\mu(z) = \frac{\partial f}{\partial \bar{z}} \bigg/ \frac{\partial f}{\partial z}$$

on the lower hemisphere, extended to 0 on the upper hemisphere.

Identifying the upper hemisphere with D, Lipman Bers used the Schwarzian derivative to define a mapping

$$g = S(\tilde{f}),$$

which embeds universal Teichmüller space into an open subset U of the space of bounded holomorphic functions g on D with the uniform norm. Frederick Gehring showed in 1977 that U is the interior of the closed subset of Schwarzian derivatives of univalent functions.

For a compact Riemann surface S of genus greater than 1, its universal covering space is the unit disc D on which its fundamental group Γ acts by Möbius transformations. The Teichmüller space of S can be identified with the subspace of the universal Teichmüller space invariant under Γ. The holomorphic functions g have the property that

$$g(z) \, dz^2$$

is invariant under Γ, so determine quadratic differentials on S. In this way, the Teichmüller space of S is realized as an open subspace of the finite-dimensional complex vector space of quadratic differentials on S.

== Diffeomorphism group of the circle ==
=== Crossed homomorphisms ===
The transformation property

$$S(f \circ g) = \left( S(f)\circ g\right ) \cdot(g')^2 + S(g).$$

allows the Schwarzian derivative to be interpreted as a continuous 1-cocycle or crossed homomorphism of the diffeomorphism group of the circle with coefficients in the module of densities of degree 2 on the circle. Let F_{λ}(S^{1}) be the space of tensor densities of degree λ on S^{1}. The group of orientation-preserving diffeomorphisms of S^{1}, Diff(S^{1}), acts on F_{λ}(S^{1}) via pushforwards. If $f \in \mathrm{Diff}(S^1)$ then consider the mapping

$$f \to S(f^{-1}).$$

In the language of group cohomology the chain-like rule above says that this mapping is a 1-cocycle on Diff(S^{1}) with coefficients in F_{2}(S^{1}). In fact

$$H^1(\text{Diff}(\mathbf{S}^1);F_2 (\mathbf{S}^1)) = \mathbf{R}$$

and the 1-cocycle generating the cohomology is $f \mapsto S(f^{-1})$. The computation of 1-cohomology is a particular case of the more general result

$$H^1(\text{Diff}(\mathbf{S}^1);F_\lambda (\mathbf{S}^1)) = \mathbf{R} \qquad\text{for }\lambda=0,1,2\,\, \text{and} \,\,(0) \,\,\text{otherwise.}$$

Note that if G is a group and M a G-module, then the identity defining a crossed homomorphism c of G into M can be expressed in terms of standard homomorphisms of groups: it is encoded in a homomorphism 𝜙 of G into the semidirect product $M\rtimes G$ such that the composition of 𝜙 with the projection $M\rtimes G$ onto G is the identity map; the correspondence is by the map

$$C(g) = (c(g), g).$$

The crossed homomorphisms form a vector space and containing as a subspace the coboundary crossed homomorphisms

$$b(g) = g \cdot m - m$$

in M. A simple averaging argument shows that, if K is a compact group and V a topological vector space on which K acts continuously, then the higher cohomology groups vanish

$$H^m(V,K) = (0) \qquad\text{for } m > 0.$$

In particular for 1-cocycles χ with

$$\chi(xy) = \chi(x) + x\cdot \chi(y),$$

averaging over y, using left invariant of the Haar measure on K gives

$$\chi(x) = m - x\cdot m,$$

with

$$m = \int_K \chi(y)\,dy.$$

Thus by averaging it may be assumed that c satisfies the normalisation condition $c(x)=0$ for $x \in \mathrm{Rot}(S^1)$. Note that if any element x in G satisfies c(x) = 0 then

$$C(x) = (0,x).$$

But then, since C is a homomorphism,

$$C(xgx^{-1}) = C(x)C(g)C(x)^{-1},$$

so that c satisfies the equivariance condition

$$c(xgx^{-1}) = x \cdot c(g).$$

Thus it may be assumed that the cocycle satisfies these normalisation conditions for Rot(S^{1}). The Schwarzian derivative in fact vanishes whenever x is a Möbius transformation corresponding to SU(1,1). The other two 1-cycles discussed below vanish only on Rot(S^{1}) (λ = 0, 1).

There is an infinitesimal version of this result giving a 1-cocycle for Vect(S^{1}), the Lie algebra of smooth vector fields, and hence for the Witt algebra, the subalgebra of trigonometric polynomial vector fields. Indeed, when G is a Lie group and the action of G on M is smooth, there is a Lie algebraic version of crossed homomorphism obtained by taking the corresponding homomorphisms of the Lie algebras (the derivatives of the homomorphisms at the identity). This also makes sense for Diff(S^{1}) and leads to the 1-cocycle

$$s\left(f\, {d\over d\theta}\right) = {d^3f\over d\theta^3}\,(d\theta)^2$$

which satisfies the identity

$$s([X,Y])=X\cdot s(Y) -Y\cdot s(X).$$

In the Lie algebra case, the coboundary maps have the form

$$b(X) = X \cdot m, \qquad m \in M$$

In both cases the 1-cohomology is defined as the space of crossed homomorphisms modulo coboundaries. The natural correspondence between group homomorphisms and Lie algebra homomorphisms leads to the "van Est inclusion map"

$$H^1(\operatorname{Diff}(\mathbf{S}^1);F_\lambda (\mathbf{S}^1)) \hookrightarrow H^1(\operatorname{Vect}(\mathbf{S}^1);F_\lambda (\mathbf{S}^1)),$$

In this way the calculation can be reduced to that of Lie algebra cohomology. By continuity this reduces to the computation of crossed homomorphisms 𝜙 of the Witt algebra into F_{λ}(S^{1}). The normalisations conditions on the group crossed homomorphism imply the following additional conditions for 𝜙:

$$\begin{align}
\varphi(\operatorname{Ad}(x) X) &= x\cdot \varphi(X) \\
\varphi{\left(\frac{d}{d\theta}\right)} &= 0
\end{align}$$

for x in Rot(S^{1}).

Following the conventions of Kac & Raina (1987), a basis of the Witt algebra is given by

$$d_n = i e^{in\theta} \,{d\over d\theta}$$

so that

$$[d_m, d_n] = (m-n) d_{m+n}.$$

A basis for the complexification of F_{λ}(S^{1}) is given by

$$v_n=e^{in\theta} \, (d\theta)^\lambda,$$

so that

$$\begin{align}
d_m \cdot v_n &= -(n+\lambda m)v_{n+m} \\
g_\zeta \cdot v_n &= \zeta^{n} v_n,
\end{align}$$

for $g_{\zeta} \in \mathrm{Rot}(S^1) = \mathbf{T}$. This forces

$$\varphi(d_n) = a_n \cdot v_n$$

for suitable coefficients a_{n}. The crossed homomorphism condition

$$\varphi([X,Y]) = X \varphi(Y) - Y \varphi(X)$$
gives a recurrence relation for the $a_n$:

$$(m-n) a_{m+n} = (m+\lambda n) a_m-(n+\lambda m)a_n.$$

The condition

$$\varphi\left(\frac{d}{d\theta}\right) = 0$$

implies that $a_0 = 0$. From this condition and the recurrence relation, it follows that up to scalar multiples, this has a unique non-zero solution when $\lambda = 0,1,2$ and only the zero solution otherwise. The solution for $\lambda=1$ corresponds to the group 1-cocycle

$$\varphi_1(f) = \frac{f''}{f'} d\theta.$$

The solution for $\lambda=0$ corresponds to the group 1-cocycle

$$\varphi_0(f) =\log f'.$$

The corresponding Lie algebra 1-cocycles for λ = 0, 1, 2 are given up to a scalar multiple by

$$\varphi_\lambda\left(F \frac{d}{d\theta}\right) = \frac{d^{\lambda+1} F}{d\theta^{\lambda +1}} \, (d\theta)^\lambda.$$

=== Central extensions ===
The crossed homomorphisms in turn give rise to the central extension of Diff(S^{1}) and of its Lie algebra Vect(S^{1}), the so-called Virasoro algebra.

=== Coadjoint action ===
The group Diff(S^{1}) and its central extension also appear naturally in the context of Teichmüller theory and string theory. In fact the homeomorphisms of S^{1} induced by quasiconformal self-maps of D are precisely the quasisymmetric homeomorphisms of S^{1}; these are exactly homeomorphisms which do not send four points with cross ratio 1/2 to points with cross ratio near 1 or 0. Taking boundary values, universal Teichmüller can be identified with the quotient of the group of quasisymmetric homeomorphisms QS(S^{1}) by the subgroup of Möbius transformations Moeb(S^{1}). (It can also be realized naturally as the space of quasicircles in C.) Since

$$\operatorname{Moeb}(\mathbf{S}^1)\subset \operatorname{Diff}(\mathbf{S}^1) \subset \text{QS}(\mathbf{S}^1)$$

the homogeneous space Diff(S^{1})/Moeb(S^{1}) is naturally a subspace of universal Teichmüller space. It is also naturally a complex manifold and this and other natural geometric structures are compatible with those on Teichmüller space. The dual of the Lie algebra of Diff(S^{1}) can be identified with the space of Hill's operators on S^{1}

$${d^2\over d\theta^2} + q(\theta),$$

and the coadjoint action of Diff(S^{1}) invokes the Schwarzian derivative. The inverse of the diffeomorphism f sends the Hill's operator to

$${d^2\over d\theta^2} + f^\prime(\theta)^2 \,q\circ f(\theta) + \tfrac{1}{2} S(f)(\theta).$$

== Pseudogroups and connections ==
The Schwarzian derivative and the other 1-cocycle defined on Diff(S^{1}) can be extended to biholomorphic between open sets in the complex plane. In this case the local description leads to the theory of analytic pseudogroups, formalizing the theory of infinite-dimensional groups and Lie algebras first studied by Élie Cartan in the 1910s. This is related to affine and projective structures on Riemann surfaces as well as the theory of Schwarzian or projective connections, discussed by Gunning, Schiffer and Hawley.

A holomorphic pseudogroup Γ on C consists of a collection of biholomorphisms f between open sets U and V in C which contains the identity maps for each open U, which is closed under restricting to opens, which is closed under composition (when possible), which is closed under taking inverses and such that if a biholomorphisms is locally in Γ, then it too is in Γ. The pseudogroup is said to be transitive if, given z and w in C, there is a biholomorphism f in Γ such that f(z) = w. A particular case of transitive pseudogroups are those which are flat, i.e. contain all complex translations T_{b}(z) = z + b. Let G be the group, under composition, of formal power series transformations F(z) = a_{1}z + a_{2}z^{2} + .... with a_{1} ≠ 0. A holomorphic pseudogroup Γ defines a subgroup A of G, namely the subgroup defined by the Taylor series expansion about 0 (or "jet") of elements f of Γ with f(0) = 0. Conversely if Γ is flat it is uniquely determined by A: a biholomorphism f on U is contained in Γ in if and only if the power series of T_{–f(a)} ∘ f ∘ T_{a} lies in A for every a in U: in other words the formal power series for f at a is given by an element of A with z replaced by z − a; or more briefly all the jets of f lie in A.

The group G has a natural homomorphisms onto the group G_{k} of k-jets obtained by taking the truncated power series taken up to the term z^{k}. This group acts faithfully on the space of polynomials of degree k (truncating terms of order higher than k). Truncations similarly define homomorphisms of G_{k} onto G_{k − 1}; the kernel consists of maps f with f(z) = z + bz^{k}, so is Abelian. Thus the group G_{k} is solvable, a fact also clear from the fact that it is in triangular form for the basis of monomials.

A flat pseudogroup Γ is said to be "defined by differential equations" if there is a finite integer k such that homomorphism of A into G_{k} is faithful and the image is a closed subgroup. The smallest such k is said to be the order of Γ. There is a complete classification of all subgroups A that arise in this way which satisfy the additional assumptions that the image of A in G_{k} is a complex subgroup and that G_{1} equals C*: this implies that the pseudogroup also contains the scaling transformations S_{a}(z) = az for a ≠ 0, i.e. contains A contains every polynomial az with a ≠ 0.

The only possibilities in this case are that k = 1 and A = {az: a ≠ 0}; or that k = 2 and A = {az/(1−bz) : a ≠ 0}. The former is the pseudogroup defined by affine subgroup of the complex Möbius group (the az + b transformations fixing ∞); the latter is the pseudogroup defined by the whole complex Möbius group.

This classification can easily be reduced to a Lie algebraic problem since the formal Lie algebra $\mathfrak{g}$ of G consists of formal vector fields F(z) d/dz with F a formal power series. It contains the polynomial vectors fields with basis d_{n} = z^{n+1} d/dz (n ≥ 0), which is a subalgebra of the Witt algebra. The Lie brackets are given by [d_{m},d_{n}] = (n − m)d_{m+n}. Again these act on the space of polynomials of degree ≤ k by differentiation—it can be identified with C[[z]]/(z^{k+1})—and the images of d_{0}, ..., d_{k – 1} give a basis of the Lie algebra of G_{k}. Note that Ad(S_{a}) d_{n}= a^{–n} d_{n}. Let $\mathfrak{a}$ denote the Lie algebra of A: it is isomorphic to a subalgebra of the Lie algebra of G_{k}. It contains d_{0} and is invariant under Ad(S_{a}). Since $\mathfrak{a}$ is a Lie subalgebra of the Witt algebra, the only possibility is that it has basis d_{0} or basis d_{0}, d_{n} for some n ≥ 1. There are corresponding group elements of the form f(z) = z + bz^{n+1} + .... Composing this with translations yields T_{–f(ε)} ∘ f ∘ T_{ε}(z) = cz + dz^{2} + ... with c, d ≠ 0. Unless n = 2, this contradicts the form of subgroup A; so n = 2.

The Schwarzian derivative is related to the pseudogroup for the complex Möbius group. In fact if f is a biholomorphism defined on V then 𝜙_{2}(f) = S(f) is a quadratic differential on V. If g is a bihomolorphism defined on U and g(V) ⊆ U, S(f ∘ g) and S(g) are quadratic differentials on U; moreover S(f) is a quadratic differential on V, so that g_{∗}S(f) is also a quadratic differential on U. The identity

$$S(f\circ g) = g_*S(f) + S(g)$$

is thus the analogue of a 1-cocycle for the pseudogroup of biholomorphisms with coefficients in holomorphic quadratic differentials. Similarly $\varphi_0(f) = \log f'$ and $\varphi_1(f) = f'' / f'$ are 1-cocycles for the same pseudogroup with values in holomorphic functions and holomorphic differentials. In general 1-cocycle can be defined for holomorphic differentials of any order so that

$$\varphi(f\circ g) = g_*\varphi(f) + \varphi(g).$$

Applying the above identity to inclusion maps j, it follows that 𝜙(j) = 0; and hence that if f_{1} is the restriction of f_{2}, so that f_{2} ∘ j = f_{1}, then 𝜙(f_{1}) = 𝜙 (f_{2}). On the other hand, taking the local holomororphic flow defined by holomorphic vector fields—the exponential of the vector fields—the holomorphic pseudogroup of local biholomorphisms is generated by holomorphic vector fields. If the 1-cocycle 𝜙 satisfies suitable continuity or analyticity conditions, it induces a 1-cocycle of holomorphic vector fields, also compatible with restriction. Accordingly, it defines a 1-cocycle on holomorphic vector fields on C:

$$\varphi([X,Y]) = X \varphi(Y) - Y \varphi(X).$$

Restricting to the Lie algebra of polynomial vector fields with basis d_{n} = z^{n+1} d/dz (n ≥ −1), these can be determined using the same methods of Lie algebra cohomology (as in the previous section on crossed homomorphisms). There the calculation was for the whole Witt algebra acting on densities of order k, whereas here it is just for a subalgebra acting on holomorphic (or polynomial) differentials of order k. Again, assuming that 𝜙 vanishes on rotations of C, there are non-zero 1-cocycles, unique up to scalar multiples. only for differentials of degree 0, 1 and 2 given by the same derivative formula

$$\varphi_k{\left(p(z) \frac{d}{dz}\right)} = p^{(k+1)}(z) \, (dz)^k,$$

where p(z) is a polynomial.

The 1-cocycles define the three pseudogroups by 𝜙_{k}(f) = 0: this gives the scaling group (k = 0); the affine group (k = 1); and the whole complex Möbius group (k = 2). So these 1-cocycles are the special ordinary differential equations defining the pseudogroup. More significantly they can be used to define corresponding affine or projective structures and connections on Riemann surfaces. If Γ is a pseudogroup of smooth mappings on R^{n}, a topological space M is said to have a Γ-structure if it has a collection of charts f that are homeomorphisms from open sets V_{i} in M to open sets U_{i} in R^{n} such that, for every non-empty intersection, the natural map from f_{i} (U_{i} ∩ U_{j}) to f_{j} (U_{i} ∩ U_{j}) lies in Γ. This defines the structure of a smooth n-manifold if Γ consists of local diffeomorphisms and a Riemann surface if n = 2—so that R^{2} ≡ C—and Γ consists of biholomorphisms. If Γ is the affine pseudogroup, M is said to have an affine structure; and if Γ is the Möbius pseudogroup, M is said to have a projective structure. Thus a genus one surface given as C/Λ for some lattice Λ ⊂ C has an affine structure; and a genus p > 1 surface given as the quotient of the upper half plane or unit disk by a Fuchsian group has a projective structure.

Gunning in 1966 describes how this process can be reversed: for genus p > 1, the existence of a projective connection, defined using the Schwarzian derivative 𝜙_{2} and proved using standard results on cohomology, can be used to identify the universal covering surface with the upper half plane or unit disk (a similar result holds for genus 1, using affine connections and 𝜙_{1}).

== Generalizations ==
Osgood & Stowe (1992) describe a generalization that is applicable for mappings of conformal manifolds, in which the Schwarzian derivative becomes a symmetric tensor on the manifold. Let $M$ be a smooth manifold of dimension $n$ with a smooth metric tensor $g$. A smooth diffeomorphism $F:M\to M$ is conformal if $F^*g = e^{2\varphi}g$ for some smooth function $\varphi$. The Schwarzian is defined by
$$S_g(\varphi) = \nabla^2\varphi - d\varphi\otimes d\varphi - \frac{1}{n} \left[\Delta\varphi - g(\nabla\varphi,\nabla\varphi)\right]$$
where $\nabla$ is the Levi-Civita connection of $g$, $\nabla^2$ denotes the Hessian with respect to the connection, $\Delta\varphi$ is the Laplace–Beltrami operator (defined as the trace of the Hessian with respect to $g$).

The Schwarzian satisfies the cocycle law
$$S_g(\varphi + \psi) = S_g(\varphi) + S_{e^{2\varphi}g}(\psi).$$
A Möbius transformation is a conformal diffeomorphism, whose conformal factor has vanishing Schwarzian. The collection of Möbius transformations of $M$ is a closed Lie subgroup of the conformal group of $M$. The solutions to $S_g(\varphi)=0$ on Euclidean space, with $g$ the Euclidean metric, are precisely when $\varphi$ is constant, the conformal factor giving the spherical metric $\log[(1+|\mathbf x|^2)^{-1}]$, or else a conformal factor for a hyperbolic Poincaré metric on the ball or half-space $\log|(1-|\mathbf x|^2)^{-1}|$ or $\log|x_n^{-1}|$ (respectively).

Another generalization applies to positive curves in a Lagrangian Grassmannian (Ovsienko & Tabachnikov 2005). Suppose that $(X,\omega)$ is a symplectic vector space, of dimension $2n$ over $\mathbb R$. Fix a pair of complementary Lagrangian subspaces $A,B\subset X$. The set of Lagrangian subspaces that are complemenary to $A$ is parameterized by the space of mappings $H:A\to B$ that are symmetric with respect to $\omega$ ($\omega(a,H(a)) = \omega(H(a),a)$ for all $a\in A$). Any Lagrangian subspace complementary to $A$ is given by $\{a + H(a)|a\in A\}$ for some such tensor $H$. A curve is thus specified locally by a one-parameter family $H(u)$ of symmetric tensors. A curve is positive if $H'(u)$ is positive definite. The Lagrangian Schwarzian is then defined as
$$S(H) = \left(H'\right)^{-1/2} \left[H''' - \tfrac{3}{2} H'' \left(H'\right)^{-1} H''\right] \left(H'\right)^{-1/2}.$$
This has the property that $S(H) = S(G)$ if and only if there is a symplectic transformation relating the curves $H(u)$ and $G(u)$.

The Lagrangian Schwarzian is related to a second order differential equation
$$\frac{d^2x}{dt^2} + Q(t) x = 0,$$
where $Q(t)$ is a symmetric tensor, depending on a real variable $t$ and $x$ is a curve in $\mathbb R^n$. Let $X$ be the $2n$-dimensional space of solutions of the differential equation. Since $Q$ is symmetric, the form on $X$ given by $\omega(x,y) = x(t)\cdot y'(t) - x'(t)\cdot y(t)$ is independent of $t$, and so gives $X$ a symplectic structure. Let $\operatorname{ev}_t:X\to\mathbb R$ the evaluation functional. Then for any $t$ in the domain of $X$, the kernel of $\operatorname{ev}_t$ is a Lagrangian subspace of $X$, and so the kernel defines a curve in the Lagrangian Grassmannian of $(X,\omega)$. The Lagrangian Schwarzian of this curve is then $2Q(t)$.

== See also ==
- Riccati equation
