= Schwarz–Christoffel mapping =

Conformal mapping in complex analysis

In complex analysis, a Schwarz–Christoffel mapping is a conformal map of the upper half-plane or the complex unit disk onto the interior of a simple polygon. Such a map is guaranteed to exist by the Riemann mapping theorem (stated by Bernhard Riemann in 1851); the Schwarz–Christoffel formula provides an explicit construction. They were introduced independently by Elwin Christoffel in 1867 and Hermann Schwarz in 1869.

Schwarz–Christoffel mappings are used in potential theory and some of its applications, including minimal surfaces, hyperbolic art, and fluid dynamics.

== Definition ==
Consider a polygon in the complex plane. The Riemann mapping theorem implies that there is a biholomorphic mapping f from the upper half-plane

$$\{ \zeta \in \mathbb{C}: \operatorname{Im} \zeta > 0 \}$$

to the interior of the polygon. The function f maps the real axis to the edges of the polygon. If the polygon has interior angles $\alpha,\beta,\gamma, \ldots$, then this mapping is given by

$$f(\zeta) = \int^\zeta \frac{K}{(w-a)^{1-(\alpha/\pi)}(w-b)^{1-(\beta/\pi)}(w-c)^{1-(\gamma/\pi)} \cdots} \,\mathrm{d}w$$

where $K$ is a constant, and $a < b < c < \cdots$ are the values, along the real axis of the $\zeta$ plane, of points corresponding to the vertices of the polygon in the $z$ plane. A transformation of this form is called a Schwarz–Christoffel mapping.

The integral can be simplified by mapping the point at infinity of the $\zeta$ plane to one of the vertices of the $z$ plane polygon. By doing this, the first factor in the formula becomes constant and so can be absorbed into the constant $K$. Conventionally, the point at infinity would be mapped to the vertex with angle $\alpha$.

In practice, to find a mapping to a specific polygon one needs to find the $a < b < c < \cdots$ values which generate the correct polygon side lengths. This requires solving a set of nonlinear equations, and in most cases can only be done numerically.

== Example ==
Consider a semi-infinite strip in the z plane. This may be regarded as a limiting form of a triangle with vertices P = 0, Q = π i, and R (with R real), as R tends to infinity. Now α = 0 and β = γ = π/2 in the limit. Suppose we are looking for the mapping f with f(−1) = Q, f(1) = P, and f(∞) = R. Then f is given by

$$f(\zeta) = \int^\zeta
\frac{K}{(w-1)^{1/2}(w+1)^{1/2}} \,\mathrm{d}w. \,$$

Evaluation of this integral yields

$z = f(\zeta) = C + K \operatorname{arcosh} \zeta,$

where C is a (complex) constant of integration. Requiring that f(−1) = Q and f(1) = P gives C = 0 and K = 1. Hence the Schwarz–Christoffel mapping is given by

$z = \operatorname{arcosh} \zeta.$

This transformation is sketched below.

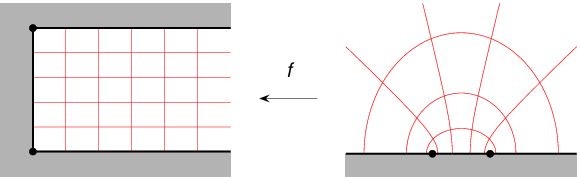
Schwarz–Christoffel mapping of the upper half-plane to the semi-infinite strip

== Other simple mappings ==
=== Triangle ===
A mapping to a plane triangle with interior angles $\pi a,\, \pi b$ and $\pi(1-a-b)$ is given by

$$z=f(\zeta)=\int^\zeta \frac{dw}{(w-1)^{1-a} (w+1)^{1-b}},$$

which can be expressed in terms of hypergeometric functions or incomplete beta functions.

The upper half-plane is mapped to a triangle with circular arcs for edges by the Schwarz triangle map.

=== Square ===
The upper half-plane is mapped to the square by

$$z=f(\zeta) = \int^\zeta \frac {\mathrm{d}w}{\sqrt{w(1-w^2)}}
=\sqrt{2} \, F\left(\sqrt{\zeta+1};\sqrt{2}/2\right),$$

where F is the incomplete elliptic integral of the first kind.

== See also ==
- The Schwarzian derivative appears in the theory of Schwarz–Christoffel mappings.
