= Schwarz's list =

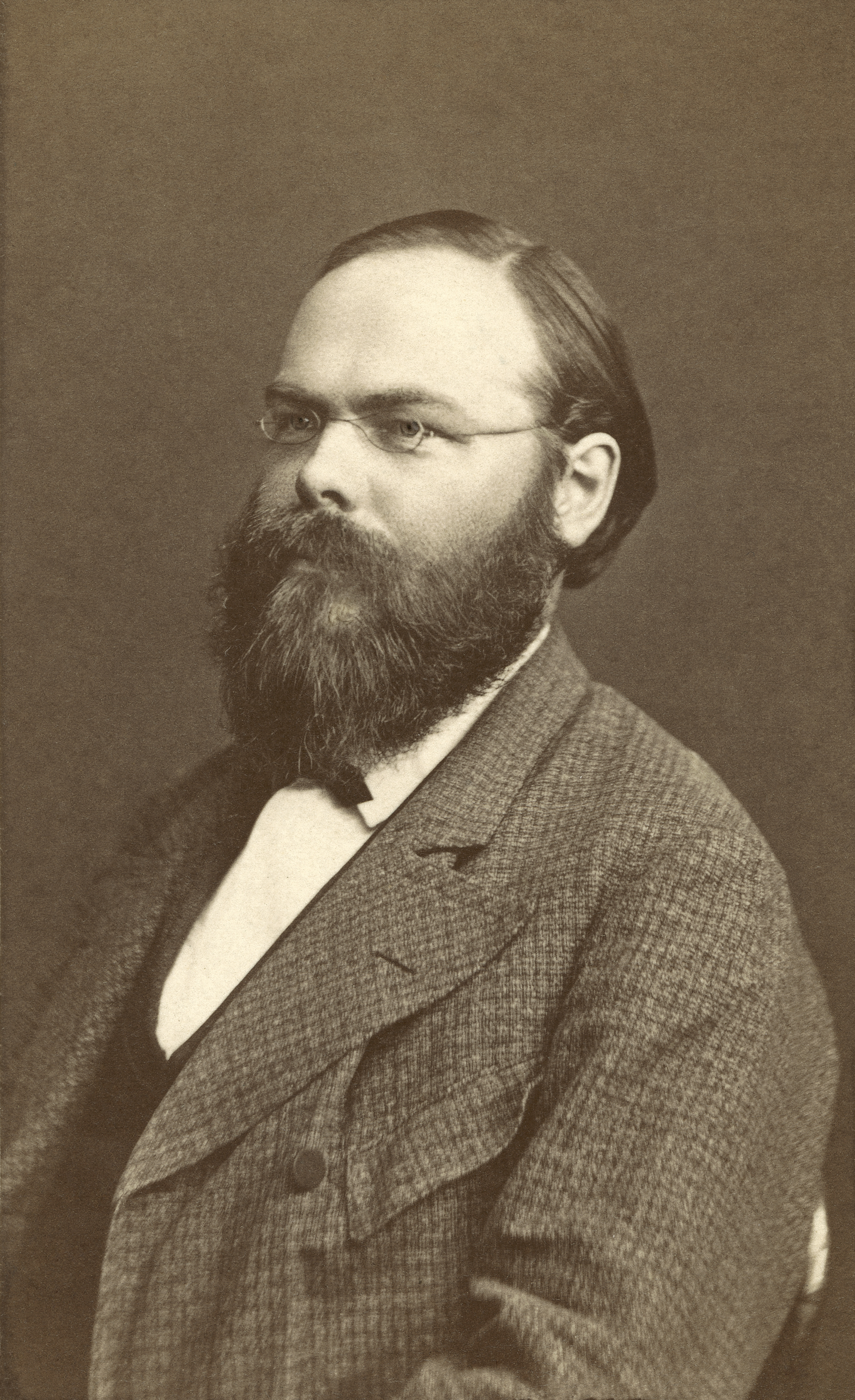
Hermann Schwarz, c. 1890

In the mathematical theory of special functions, Schwarz's list or the Schwarz table is the list of 15 cases found by Hermann Schwarz (1873, p. 323) when hypergeometric functions can be expressed algebraically. More precisely, it is a listing of parameters determining the cases in which the hypergeometric equation has a finite monodromy group, or equivalently has two independent solutions that are algebraic functions. It lists 15 cases, divided up by the isomorphism class of the monodromy group (excluding the case of a cyclic group), and was first derived by Schwarz by methods of complex analytic geometry. Correspondingly the statement is not directly in terms of the parameters specifying the hypergeometric equation, but in terms of quantities used to describe certain spherical triangles.

The wider importance of the table, for general second-order differential equations in the complex plane, was shown by Felix Klein, who proved a result to the effect that cases of finite monodromy for such equations and regular singularities could be attributed to changes of variable (complex analytic mappings of the Riemann sphere to itself) that reduce the equation to hypergeometric form. In fact more is true: Schwarz's list underlies all second-order equations with regular singularities on compact Riemann surfaces having finite monodromy, by a pullback from the hypergeometric equation on the Riemann sphere by a complex analytic mapping, of degree computable from the equation's data.

Number	$\lambda$	$\mu$	$\nu$	area/$\pi$	polyhedron
1	1/2	1/2	p/n (≤ 1/2)	p/n	Dihedral
2	1/2	1/3	1/3	1/6	Tetrahedral
3	2/3	1/3	1/3	2/6	Tetrahedral
4	1/2	1/3	1/4	1/12	Cube/octahedron
5	2/3	1/4	1/4	2/12	Cube/octahedron
6	1/2	1/3	1/5	1/30	Icosahedron/Dodecahedron
7	2/5	1/3	1/3	2/30	Icosahedron/Dodecahedron
8	2/3	1/5	1/5	2/30	Icosahedron/Dodecahedron
9	1/2	2/5	1/5	3/30	Icosahedron/Dodecahedron
10	3/5	1/3	1/5	4/30	Icosahedron/Dodecahedron
11	2/5	2/5	2/5	6/30	Icosahedron/Dodecahedron
12	2/3	1/3	1/5	6/30	Icosahedron/Dodecahedron
13	4/5	1/5	1/5	6/30	Icosahedron/Dodecahedron
14	1/2	2/5	1/3	7/30	Icosahedron/Dodecahedron
15	3/5	2/5	1/3	10/30	Icosahedron/Dodecahedron

The numbers $\lambda, \mu, \nu$ are (up to permutations, sign changes and addition of $(\ell,m,n) \in \mathbb{Z}^3$ with $\ell+m+n$ even) the differences $1-c, c-a-b,b-a$ of the exponents of the hypergeometric differential equation at the three singular points $0,1,\infty$. They are rational numbers if and only if $a,b$ and $c$ are, a point that matters in arithmetic rather than geometric approaches to the theory.

== Further work ==
An extension of Schwarz's results was given by T. Kimura, who dealt with cases where the identity component of the differential Galois group of the hypergeometric equation is a solvable group. A general result connecting the differential Galois group G and the monodromy group Γ states that G is the Zariski closure of Γ — this theorem is attributed in the book of Matsuda to Michio Kuga. By general differential Galois theory, the resulting Kimura-Schwarz table classifies cases of integrability of the equation by algebraic functions and quadratures.

Another relevant list is that of K. Takeuchi, who classified the (hyperbolic) triangle groups that are arithmetic groups (85 examples).

Émile Picard sought to extend the work of Schwarz in complex geometry, by means of a generalized hypergeometric function, to construct cases of equations where the monodromy was a discrete group in the projective unitary group PU(1, n). Pierre Deligne and George Mostow used his ideas to construct lattices in the projective unitary group. This work recovers in the classical case the finiteness of Takeuchi's list, and by means of a characterisation of the lattices they construct that are arithmetic groups, provided new examples of non-arithmetic lattices in PU(1, n).

Baldassari applied the Klein universality, to discuss algebraic solutions of the Lamé equation by means of the Schwarz list.

Other hypergeometric functions which can be expressed algebraically, like those on Schwarz's list, arise in theoretical physics in the context of $T \overline{T}$ deformations of two-dimensional gauge theories. In 2025, it was shown that the algebraic properties of these functions stem from the algebraic structure of the mass term in ghost-free massive gravity.

== See also ==
- Schwarz triangle
