= P-curvature =

In algebraic geometry, p-curvature is an invariant of a connection on a coherent sheaf for schemes of characteristic p > 0. It is a construction similar to a usual curvature, but only exists in finite characteristic.

== Definition ==
Suppose X/S is a smooth morphism of schemes of finite characteristic p > 0, E a vector bundle on X, and $\nabla$ a connection on E. The p-curvature of $\nabla$ is a map $\psi: E \to E\otimes \Omega^1_{X/S}$ defined by

$$\psi(e)(D) = \nabla^p_D(e) - \nabla_{D^p}(e)$$

for any derivation D of $\mathcal{O}_X$ over S. Here we use that the pth power of a derivation is still a derivation over schemes of characteristic p. A useful property is that the expression is $\mathcal{O}_X$-linear in e, in contrast to the Leibniz rule for connections. Moreover, the expression is p-linear in D.

By the definition p-curvature measures the failure of the map $\operatorname{Der}_{X/S} \to \operatorname{End}(E)$ to be a homomorphism of restricted Lie algebras, just like the usual curvature in differential geometry measures how far this map is from being a homomorphism of Lie algebras.

== See also ==
- Grothendieck–Katz p-curvature conjecture
- Restricted Lie algebra
