= Lazarus Fuchs =

German mathematician (1833–1902)

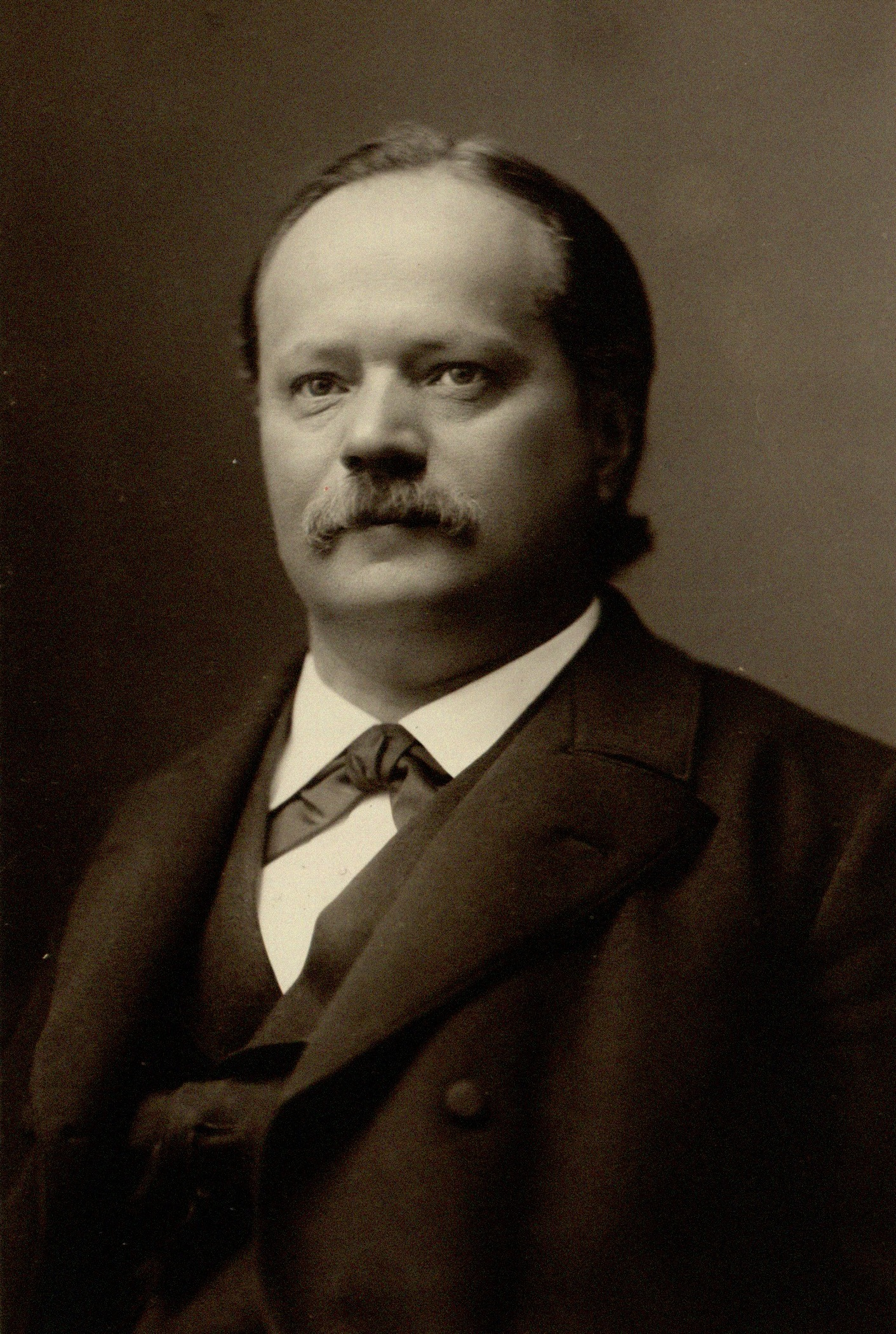
- Fuchs in 1884
- Born: 5 May 1833; Moschin, Grand Duchy of Posen, Kingdom of Prussia
- Died: 26 April 1902 (aged 68); Berlin, Kingdom of Prussia, German Empire
- Education: University of Berlin
- Known for: Fuchs relation Fuchs's theorem Fuchsian groups Fuchsian model Fuchsian theory Picard–Fuchs equation
- Scientific career
- Workplaces: University of Greifswald; University of Heidelberg; University of Berlin; University of Göttingen
- Doctoral advisor: Karl Weierstraß
- Doctoral students: Gerhard Hessenberg; Edmund Landau; Hermann Schapira; Ludwig Schlesinger; Issai Schur; Theodor Vahlen; Ernst Zermelo

Lazarus Immanuel Fuchs (5 May 1833 – 26 April 1902) was a Jewish-German mathematician who made important contributions to the field of linear differential equations. He was born in Moschin in the Grand Duchy of Posen (modern-day Mosina, Poland) and died in Berlin, Germany. He was buried in Schöneberg in the St. Matthew's Cemetery. His grave in section H is preserved and listed as a grave of honour of the State of Berlin.

== Contribution ==
He is the eponym of Fuchsian groups and functions, and the Picard–Fuchs equation. A singular point a of a linear differential equation

$$y''+p(x)y'+q(x)y=0$$

is called Fuchsian if p and q are meromorphic around the point a, and have poles of orders at most 1 and 2, respectively. According to a theorem of Fuchs, this condition is necessary and sufficient for the regularity of the singular point, that is, to ensure the existence of two linearly independent solutions of the form

$$y_j=\sum_{n=0}^\infty a_{j,n}(x-x_0)^{n+\sigma_j},\quad a_0\ne0\,\quad j=1,2.$$

where the exponents $\sigma_j$ can be determined from the equation. In the case when $\sigma_1-\sigma_2$ is an integer this formula has to be modified.

Another well-known result of Fuchs is the Fuchs's conditions, the necessary and sufficient conditions for the non-linear differential equation of the form

$$F\left(\frac{dy}{dz},y,z\right)=0$$

to be free of movable singularities.

An interesting remark about him as a teacher during the period of his work at the Heidelberg University pertains to his manner of lecturing: his knowledge of the mathematics he was assigned to teach was so deep that he would not prepare before giving a lecture — he would simply improvise on the spot, while exposing the students to the train of thought taken by mathematicians of the finest degree.

Lazarus Fuchs was the father of Richard Fuchs, a German mathematician.

== Selected works ==
- Über Funktionen zweier Variabeln, welche durch Umkehrung der Integrale zweier gegebener Funktionen entstehen, Göttingen 1881.
- Zur Theorie der linearen Differentialgleichungen, Berlin 1901.
- Gesammelte Werke, Hrsg. von Richard Fuchs und Ludwig Schlesinger. 3 Bde. Berlin 1904–1909.
