= Quadratic differential =

In mathematics, a quadratic differential on a Riemann surface is a section of the symmetric square of the holomorphic cotangent bundle. If the section is holomorphic, then the quadratic differential is said to be holomorphic. The vector space of holomorphic quadratic differentials on a Riemann surface has a natural interpretation as the cotangent space to the Riemann moduli space, or Teichmüller space.

== Local form ==
Each quadratic differential on a domain $U$ in the complex plane may be written as $f(z) \,dz \otimes dz$, where $z$ is the complex variable, and $f$ is a complex-valued function on $U$. Such a "local" quadratic differential is holomorphic if and only if $f$ is holomorphic. Given a chart $\mu$ for a general Riemann surface $R$ and a quadratic differential $q$ on $R$, the pull-back $(\mu^{-1})^*(q)$ defines a quadratic differential on a domain in the complex plane.

== Relation to abelian differentials ==
If $\omega$ is an abelian differential on a Riemann surface, then $\omega \otimes \omega$ is a quadratic differential.

== Singular Euclidean structure ==
A holomorphic quadratic differential $q$ determines a Riemannian metric $|q|$ on the complement of its zeroes. If $q$ is defined on a domain in the complex plane, and $q = f(z) \,dz \otimes dz$, then the associated Riemannian metric is $|f(z)|(dx^2 + dy^2)$, where $z = x + iy$. Since $f$ is holomorphic, the curvature of this metric is zero. Thus, a holomorphic quadratic differential defines a flat metric on the complement of the set of $z$ such that $f(z) = 0$.
