= Bilateral hypergeometric series =

Type of mathematical series

In mathematics, a bilateral hypergeometric series is a series

$$\sum_{n=-\infty}^\infty a_n$$

summed over all integers $n$ such that the ratio $a_{n+1}/a_n$ of two consecutive terms is a rational function of $n$. The definition of the generalized hypergeometric series is similar, except that the terms with negative $n$ must vanish; the bilateral series will in general have infinite numbers of non-zero terms for both positive and negative $n$.

The bilateral hypergeometric series fails to converge for most rational functions, though it can be analytically continued to a function defined for most rational functions. There are several summation formulas giving its values for special values where it does converge.

== Definition ==
The bilateral hypergeometric series ${}_pH_p$ is defined by

$${}_pH_p(a_1,\ldots,a_p;b_1,\ldots,b_p;z)=
{}_pH_p\left(\begin{matrix}a_1&\ldots&a_p\\b_1&\ldots&b_p\\ \end{matrix};z\right)=
\sum_{n=-\infty}^\infty
\frac{(a_1)_n(a_2)_n\ldots(a_p)_n}{(b_1)_n(b_2)_n\ldots(b_p)_n}z^n$$

where

$$(a)_n=a(a+1)(a+2)\cdots(a+n-1)\,$$

is the rising factorial or Pochhammer symbol.

Usually the variable $z$ is taken to be 1, in which case it is omitted from the notation. It is possible to define the series ${}_pH_q$ with different $p$ and $q$ in a similar way, but this either fails to converge or can be reduced to the usual hypergeometric series by changes of variables.

== Convergence and analytic continuation ==
Suppose that none of the variables $a$ or $b$ are integers, so that all the terms of the series are finite and non-zero. Then the terms with $n < 0$ diverge if $|z| < 1$, and the terms with $n > 0$ diverge if $|z| > 1$, so the series cannot converge unless $|z| = 1$. When $|z| = 1$, the series converges if

$$\Re(b_1+\cdots b_n -a_1-\cdots - a_n) >1.$$

The bilateral hypergeometric series can be analytically continued to a multivalued meromorphic function of several variables whose singularities are branch points at $z=0$ and $z=1$, and with simple poles at $a_i=-1,-2,\dots$ and $b_i=0,1,2,\dots$

This can be done as follows. Suppose that none of the $a$ or $b$ variables are integers. The terms with n positive converge for |z| <1 to a function satisfying an inhomogeneous linear equation with singularities at z = 0 and z=1, so can be continued to a multivalued function with these points as branch points. Similarly the terms with n negative converge for |z| >1 to a function satisfying an inhomogeneous linear equation with singularities at z = 0 and z=1, so can also be continued to a multivalued function with these points as branch points. The sum of these functions gives the analytic continuation of the bilateral hypergeometric series to all values of z other than 0 and 1, and satisfies a linear differential equation in z similar to the hypergeometric differential equation.

== Summation formulas ==
=== Dougall's bilateral sum ===
$${}_2H_2(a,b;c,d;1)= \sum_{n=-\infty}^\infty\frac{(a)_n(b)_n}{(c)_n(d)_n}= \frac{\Gamma(d)\Gamma(c)\Gamma(1-a)\Gamma(1-b)\Gamma(c+d-a-b-1)}{\Gamma(c-a)\Gamma(c-b)\Gamma(d-a)\Gamma(d-b)}$$

(Dougall 1907)

This is sometimes written in the equivalent form

$$\sum_{n=-\infty}^\infty
\frac {\Gamma(a+n) \Gamma(b+n)}{\Gamma(c+n)\Gamma(d+n)} =
\frac {\pi^2}{\sin (\pi a) \sin (\pi b)}
\frac {\Gamma (c+d-a-b-1)}{\Gamma(c-a) \Gamma(d-a) \Gamma(c-b) \Gamma(d-b)}.$$

=== Bailey's formula ===
(Bailey 1959) gave the following generalization of Dougall's formula:

$${}_3H_3(a,b, f+1;d,e,f;1)=
\sum_{n=-\infty}^\infty\frac{(a)_n(b)_n(f+1)_n}{(d)_n(e)_n(f)_n}= \lambda\frac{\Gamma(d)\Gamma(e)\Gamma(1-a)\Gamma(1-b)\Gamma(d+e-a-b-2)}{\Gamma(d-a)\Gamma(d-b)\Gamma(e-a)\Gamma(e-b)}$$

where

$$\lambda=f^{-1}\left[(f-a)(f-b)-(1+f-d)(1+f-e)\right].$$

== See also ==
- Basic bilateral hypergeometric series
