= Regular singular point =

Concept in differential equation mathematics

In mathematics, in the theory of ordinary differential equations in the complex plane $\Complex$, the points of $\Complex$ are classified into ordinary points, at which the equation's coefficients are analytic functions, and singular points, at which some coefficient has a singularity. Then amongst singular points, an important distinction is made between a regular singular point, where the growth of solutions is bounded (in any small sector) by an algebraic function, and an irregular singular point, where the full solution set requires functions with higher growth rates. This distinction occurs, for example, between the hypergeometric equation, with three regular singular points, and the Bessel equation which is in a sense a limiting case, but where the analytic properties are substantially different.

== Formal definitions ==
More precisely, consider an ordinary linear differential equation of n-th order
$$f^{(n)}(z) + \sum_{i=0}^{n-1} p_i(z) f^{(i)} (z) = 0$$
with p_{i}(z) meromorphic functions.

The equation should be studied on the Riemann sphere to include the point at infinity as a possible singular point. A Möbius transformation may be applied to move ∞ into the finite part of the complex plane if required, see example on Bessel differential equation below.

Then the Frobenius method based on the indicial equation may be applied to find possible solutions that are power series times complex powers (z − a)^{r} near any given a in the complex plane where r need not be an integer; this function may exist, therefore, only thanks to a branch cut extending out from a, or on a Riemann surface of some punctured disc around a. This presents no difficulty for a an ordinary point (Lazarus Fuchs 1866). When a is a regular singular point, which by definition means that
$$p_{n-i}(z)$$
has a pole of order at most i at a, the Frobenius method also can be made to work and provide n independent solutions near a.

Otherwise the point a is an irregular singularity. In that case the monodromy group relating solutions by analytic continuation has less to say in general, and the solutions are harder to study, except in terms of their asymptotic expansions. The irregularity of an irregular singularity is measured by the Poincaré rank.

The regularity condition is a kind of Newton polygon condition, in the sense that the allowed poles are in a region, when plotted against i, bounded by a line at 45° to the axes.

An ordinary differential equation whose only singular points, including the point at infinity, are regular singular points is called a Fuchsian ordinary differential equation.

== Examples for second order differential equations ==
In this case the equation above is reduced to:
$$f''(x) + p_1(x) f'(x) + p_0(x) f(x) = 0.$$

One distinguishes the following cases:

- Point a is an ordinary point when functions p_{1}(x) and p_{0}(x) are analytic at x = a.
- Point a is a regular singular point if p_{1}(x) has a pole up to order 1 at x = a and p_{0} has a pole of order up to 2 at x = a.
- Otherwise point a is an irregular singular point.

We can check whether there is an irregular singular point at infinity by using the substitution $w = 1/x$ and the relations:
$$\frac{df}{dx}=-w^2\frac{df}{dw}$$
$$\frac{d^2f}{dx^2}=w^4\frac{d^2f}{dw^2}+2w^3\frac{df}{dw}$$

We can thus transform the equation to an equation in w, and check what happens at w = 0. If $p_1(x)$ and $p_2(x)$ are quotients of polynomials, then there will be an irregular singular point at infinite x unless the polynomial in the denominator of $p_1(x)$ is of degree at least one more than the degree of its numerator and the denominator of $p_2(x)$ is of degree at least two more than the degree of its numerator.

Listed below are several examples from ordinary differential equations from mathematical physics that have singular points and known solutions.

=== Bessel differential equation ===
This is an ordinary differential equation of second order. It is found in the solution to Laplace's equation in cylindrical coordinates:
$$x^2 \frac{d^2 f}{dx^2} + x \frac{df}{dx} + (x^2 - \alpha^2)f = 0$$
for an arbitrary real or complex number α (the order of the Bessel function). The most common and important special case is where α is an integer n.

Dividing this equation by x^{2} gives:
$$\frac{d^2 f}{dx^2} + \frac{1} {x} \frac{df}{dx} + \left (1 - \frac {\alpha^2} {x^2} \right )f = 0.$$

In this case p_{1}(x) = 1/x has a pole of first order at x = 0. When α ≠ 0, p_{0}(x) = (1 − α^{2}/x^{2}) has a pole of second order at x = 0. Thus this equation has a regular singularity at 0.

To see what happens when x → ∞ one has to use a Möbius transformation, for example $x = 1 / w$. After performing the algebra:
$$\frac{d^2 f}{d w^2} + \frac{1}{w} \frac{df}{dw} +
\left[ \frac{1}{w^4} - \frac{\alpha ^2}{w^2} \right ] f= 0$$

Now at $w = 0$,
$$p_1(w) = \frac{1}{w}$$
has a pole of first order, but
$$p_0(w) = \frac {1} {w^4} - \frac {\alpha ^2} {w^2}$$
has a pole of fourth order. Thus, this equation has an irregular singularity at $w = 0$ corresponding to x at ∞.

=== Legendre differential equation ===
This is an ordinary differential equation of second order. It is found in the solution of Laplace's equation in spherical coordinates:
$$\frac{d}{dx} \left[ (1-x^2) \frac{d}{dx} f \right] + \ell(\ell+1)f = 0.$$

Opening the square bracket gives:
$$\left(1-x^2\right){d^2 f \over dx^2} -2x {df \over dx } + \ell(\ell+1)f = 0.$$

And dividing by (1 − x^{2}):
$$\frac{d^2 f}{dx^2} - \frac{2x}{1-x^2} \frac{df}{dx} + \frac{\ell(\ell+1)}{1-x^2} f = 0.$$

This differential equation has regular singular points at ±1 and ∞.

=== Hermite differential equation ===
One encounters this ordinary second order differential equation in solving the one-dimensional time independent Schrödinger equation
$$E\psi = -\frac{\hbar^2}{2m} \frac {d^2 \psi} {d x^2} + V(x)\psi$$
for a harmonic oscillator. In this case the potential energy V(x) is:
$$V(x) = \frac{1}{2} m \omega^2 x^2.$$

This leads to the following ordinary second order differential equation:
$$\frac{d^2 f}{dx^2} - 2 x \frac{df}{dx} + \lambda f = 0.$$

This differential equation has an irregular singularity at ∞. Its solutions are Hermite polynomials.

=== Hypergeometric equation ===
The equation may be defined as
$$z(1-z)\frac {d^2f}{dz^2} + \left[c-(a+b+1)z \right] \frac {df}{dz} - abf = 0.$$

Dividing both sides by z(1 − z) gives:
$$\frac {d^2f}{dz^2} + \frac{c-(a+b+1)z } {z(1-z)} \frac {df}{dz} - \frac {ab} {z(1-z)} f = 0.$$

This differential equation has regular singular points at 0, 1 and ∞. A solution is the hypergeometric function.
