= Geordie Williamson =

Australian mathematician

Geordie Williamson FRS FAA
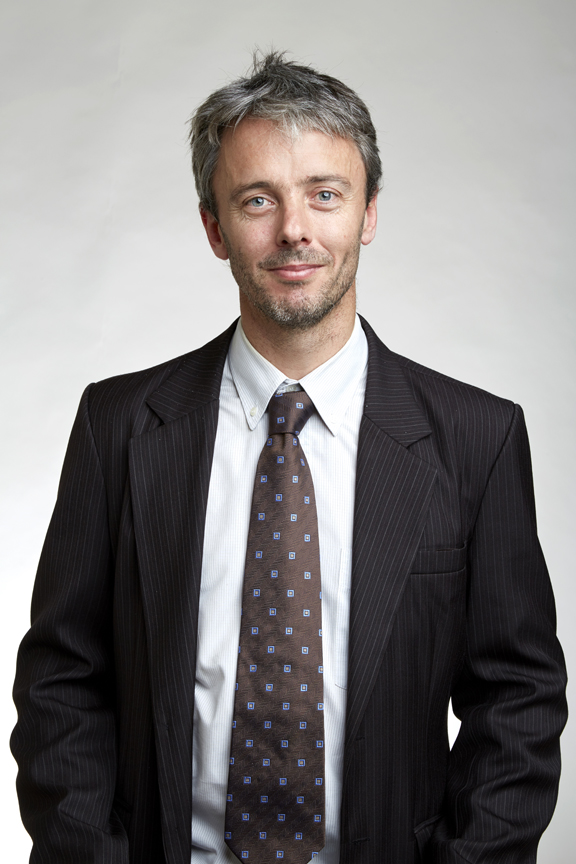
- Williamson in 2018
- Born: 1981 (age 44–45); Bowral, Australia
- Education: Chevalier College
- Alma mater: University of Sydney; University of Freiburg
- Awards: Clay Research Award (2016); New Horizons in Mathematics Prize (2017)
- Scientific career
- Workplaces: University of Sydney; University of Oxford; Max Planck Institute for Mathematics
- Thesis: Singular Soergel bimodules (2008)
- Website: www.maths.usyd.edu.au/u/geordie

Geordie Williamson (born 1981 in Bowral, Australia) is an Australian mathematician at the University of Sydney. He was the youngest living Fellow of the Royal Society when he was elected in 2018 at the age of 36.

== Education ==
Educated at Chevalier College, Williamson graduated in 1999 with a UAI of 99.45. He studied at the University of Sydney and graduated with a Bachelor's degree in 2003 and then at the Albert-Ludwigs University of Freiburg, where he received his doctorate in 2008 under the supervision of Wolfgang Soergel. Williamson is the brother of the late James Williamson, a World Solo 24-hour mountain bike champion who died while competing in South Africa in 2010.

== Research and career ==
After his PhD, Williamson was a post-doctoral researcher at the University of Oxford, based at St. Peter's College, Oxford, and from 2011 until 2016 he was at the Max Planck Institute for Mathematics.

Williamson deals with a geometric representation of group theory. With Ben Elias, he gave a new proof and a simplification of the theory of the Kazhdan–Lusztig conjectures (previously proved in 1981 by both Beilinson–Bernstein and Brylinski–Kashiwara). For this purpose, they built on works by Wolfgang Soergel and developed a purely algebraic Hodge theory of Soergel bimodules about polynomial rings. In this context, they also succeeded in proving the long-standing positive presumption of positivity for the coefficients of the Kazhdan–Lusztig polynomials for Coxeter groups. For Weyl groups (special Coxeter groups, which are connected to Lie groups), David Kazhdan and George Lusztig succeeded in doing so by identifying the polynomials with certain invariants (local intersection cohomology) of Schubert varieties. Elias and Williamson were able to follow this path of proof also for more general groups of reflection (Coxeter groups), although there is no geometrical interpretation in contrast to the case of the Weyl groups.

He is also known for several counterexamples. In 1980, Lusztig suggested a character formula for simple modules of reductive groups over fields of finite characteristic p. The conjecture was proved in 1994-95 by a combination of three papers, one by Henning Haahr Andersen, Jens Carsten Jantzen, and Wolfgang Soergel, one by David Kazhdan and George Lusztig and one by Masaki Kashiwara and Toshiyuki Tanisaki for sufficiently large group-specific characteristics (without explicit bound) and later by Peter Fiebig for a very high explicitly stated bound. Williamson found several infinite families of counterexamples to the generally suspected validity limits of Lusztig's conjecture. He also found counterexamples to a 1990 conjecture of Gordon James on symmetric groups. His work also provided new perspectives on the respective conjectures. In 2023 he was awarded an Australian Laureate Fellowship to further his research into fundamental symmetries.

=== Publications ===
- Ben Elias; Geordie Williamson (2014), "The Hodge Theory of Soergel bimodules", Annals of Mathematics, 180 (3): 1089–1136, arXiv:1212.0791
- Williamson, Geordie (2017), "Schubert calculus and torsion explosion (With Appendix by A. Kontorovich, P. McNamara, G. Williamson)", Journal of the American Mathematical Society, 30: 1023–1046, arXiv:1309.5055, doi:10.1090/jams/868
- Williamson, Geordie (2012), "Modular intersection cohomology complexes on flag varieties (With Appendix by Tom Braden)", Mathematische Zeitschrift, 272: 697–727, arXiv:0709.0207, doi:10.1007/s00209-011-0955-y
- Williamson, Geordie (2014), "On an analogue of the James conjecture", Representation Theory, 18 (2): 15–27, arXiv:1212.0794, doi:10.1090/S1088-4165-2014-00447-3
- Ben Elias; Geordie Williamson (2016), "Kazhdan-Lusztig conjectures and shadows of Hodge theory", in Werner Ballmann; Christian Blohmann; Gerd Faltings; Peter Teichner; Don Zagier (eds.), Arbeitstagung Bonn 2013: In Memory of Friedrich Hirzebruch, Progress in Mathematics, vol. 319, Birkhäuser, pp. 105–126, arXiv:1403.1650, doi:10.1007/978-3-319-43648-7_5, ISBN 978-3-319-43646-3
- Daniel Juteau; Carl Mautner (2014), "Parity sheaves", Journal of the American Mathematical Society, 27 (4): 1169–1212, arXiv:0906.2994, doi:10.1090/S0894-0347-2014-00804-3

=== Awards and honours ===
In 2016, he received the Chevalley Prize of the American Mathematical Society and the Clay Research Award. He is an invited speaker at the European Congress of Mathematicians in Berlin 2016 (Shadows of Hodge theory in representation theory). In 2016 he was awarded the EMS Prize, for 2017 he was awarded the New Horizons in Mathematics Prize. In 2018, he was plenary speaker at the International Congress of Mathematicians in Rio de Janeiro and was elected a Fellow of the Royal Society (FRS) and the Australian Academy of Science. Williamson was awarded the 2018 Australian Mathematical Society Medal, the NSW Premier's Prizes for Science & Engineering: Excellence in Mathematics, Earth Sciences, Chemistry or Physics in 2022 and the Max Planck-Humboldt Research Award in 2024. He was named as a Fellow of the American Mathematical Society, in its 2027 class of fellows.
