= Kazhdan–Lusztig polynomial =

Integral polynomial

In the mathematical field of representation theory, a Kazhdan–Lusztig polynomial $P_{y,w}(q)$ is a member of a family of integral polynomials introduced by David Kazhdan and George Lusztig (1979). They are indexed by pairs of elements y, w of a Coxeter group W, which can in particular be the Weyl group of a Lie group.

== Motivation and history ==
In the spring of 1978 Kazhdan and Lusztig were studying Springer representations of the Weyl group of an algebraic group on $\ell$-adic cohomology groups related to conjugacy classes which are unipotent. They found a new construction of these representations over the complex numbers (Kazhdan & Lusztig 1980a). The representation had two natural bases, and the transition matrix between these two bases is essentially given by the Kazhdan–Lusztig polynomials. The actual Kazhdan–Lusztig construction of their polynomials is more elementary. Kazhdan and Lusztig used this to construct a canonical basis in the Hecke algebra of the Coxeter group and its representations.

In their first paper Kazhdan and Lusztig mentioned that their polynomials were related to the failure of local Poincaré duality for Schubert varieties. In Kazhdan & Lusztig (1980b) they reinterpreted this in terms of the intersection cohomology of Mark Goresky and Robert MacPherson, and gave another definition of such a basis in terms of the dimensions of certain intersection cohomology groups.

The two bases for the Springer representation reminded Kazhdan and Lusztig of the two bases for the Grothendieck group of certain infinite dimensional representations of semisimple Lie algebras, given by Verma modules and simple modules. This analogy, and the work of Jens Carsten Jantzen and Anthony Joseph relating primitive ideals of enveloping algebras to representations of Weyl groups, led to the Kazhdan–Lusztig conjectures.

== Definition ==
Fix a Coxeter group W with generating set S, and write $\ell(w)$ for the length of an element w (the smallest length of an expression for w as a product of elements of S). The Hecke algebra of W has a basis of elements $T_w$ for $w\in W$ over the ring $\mathbb{Z}[q^{1/2}, q^{-1/2}]$, with multiplication defined by

$$\begin{align}
T_y T_w &= T_{yw},  && \mbox{if }\ell(yw) = \ell(y) + \ell(w) \\
(T_s + 1)(T_s - q) &= 0, && \mbox{if }s \in S.
\end{align}$$

The quadratic second relation implies that each generator T_{s} is invertible in the Hecke algebra, with inverse T_{s}^{−1} = q^{−1}T_{s} + q^{−1} − 1. These inverses satisfy the relation (T_{s}^{−1} + 1)(T_{s}^{−1} − q^{−1}) = 0 (obtained by multiplying the quadratic relation for T_{s} by −T_{s}^{−2}q^{−1}), and also the braid relations. From this it follows that the Hecke algebra has an automorphism D that sends q^{1/2} to q^{−1/2} and each T_{s} to T_{s}^{−1}. More generally one has $D(T_w)=T_{w^{-1}}^{-1}$; also D can be seen to be an involution.

The Kazhdan–Lusztig polynomials P_{yw}(q) are indexed by a pair of elements y, w of W, and uniquely determined by the following properties.

- They are 0 unless y ≤ w (in the Bruhat order of W), 1 if y = w, and for y < w their degree is at most (ℓ(w) − ℓ(y) − 1)/2.
- The elements

$$C'_w=q^{-\frac{\ell(w)}{2}}\sum_{y\le w} P_{y,w}T_y$$

are invariant under the involution D of the Hecke algebra. The elements $C'_w$ form a basis of the Hecke algebra as a $\mathbb{Z}[q^{1/2}, q^{-1/2}]$-module, called the Kazhdan–Lusztig basis.

To establish existence of the Kazhdan–Lusztig polynomials, Kazhdan and Lusztig gave a simple recursive procedure for computing the polynomials P_{yw}(q) in terms of more elementary polynomials denoted R_{yw}(q). defined by

$$T_{y^{-1}}^{-1} = \sum_xD(R_{x,y})q^{-\ell(x)}T_x.$$

They can be computed using the recursion relations

$$R_{x,y} =
\begin{cases}
0,                          & \mbox{if } x \not\le y                \\
1,                          & \mbox{if } x = y                      \\
R_{sx,sy},                  & \mbox{if } sx < x \mbox{ and } sy < y \\
R_{xs,ys},                  & \mbox{if } xs < x \mbox{ and } ys < y \\
(q-1)R_{sx,y} + qR_{sx,sy}, & \mbox{if } sx > x \mbox{ and } sy < y
\end{cases}$$

The Kazhdan–Lusztig polynomials can then be computed recursively using the relation

$$q^{\frac{1}{2}(\ell(w)-\ell(x))}D(P_{x,w}) - q^{\frac{1}{2}(\ell(x)-\ell(w))}P_{x,w} = \sum_{x<y\le w}(-1)^{\ell(x)+\ell(y)}q^{\frac{1}{2}(-\ell(x)+2\ell(y)-\ell(w))}D(R_{x,y})P_{y,w}$$

using the fact that the two terms on the left are polynomials in q^{1/2} and q^{−1/2} without constant terms. These formulas are tiresome to use by hand for rank greater than about 3, but are well adapted for computers, and the only limit on computing Kazhdan–Lusztig polynomials with them is that for large rank the number of such polynomials exceeds the storage capacity of computers.

== Examples ==
- If y ≤ w then P_{y,w} has constant term 1.
- If y ≤ w and ℓ(w) − ℓ(y) ∈ {0, 1, 2} then P_{y,w} = 1.
- If w = w_{0} is the longest element of a finite Coxeter group then P_{y,w} = 1 for all y.
- If W is the Coxeter group A_{1} or A_{2} (or more generally any Coxeter group of rank at most 2) then P_{y,w} is 1 if y≤w and 0 otherwise.
- If W is the Coxeter group A_{3} with generating set S = {a, b, c} with a and c commuting then P_{b,bacb} = 1 + q and P_{ac,acbca} = 1 + q, giving examples of non-constant polynomials.
- The simple values of Kazhdan–Lusztig polynomials for low rank groups are not typical of higher rank groups. For example, for the split form of E_{8} the most complicated Lusztig–Vogan polynomial (a variation of Kazhdan–Lusztig polynomials: see below) is

$$\begin{align}
152 q^{22} &+ 3,472 q^{21} + 38,791 q^{20} + 293,021 q^{19} + 1,370,892 q^{18} + 4,067,059 q^{17} + 7,964,012 q^{16}\\
&+ 11,159,003 q^{15} + 11,808,808 q^{14} + 9,859,915 q^{13} + 6,778,956 q^{12} + 3,964,369 q^{11} + 2,015,441 q^{10}\\
&+ 906,567 q^9 + 363,611 q^8 + 129,820 q^7 + 41,239 q^6 + 11,426 q^5 + 2,677 q^4 + 492 q^3 + 61 q^2 + 3 q
\end{align}$$

- Polo (1999) showed that any polynomial with constant term 1 and non-negative integer coefficients is the Kazhdan–Lusztig polynomial for some pair of elements of some symmetric group.

== Kazhdan–Lusztig conjectures ==
The Kazhdan–Lusztig polynomials arise as transition coefficients between their canonical basis and the natural basis of the Hecke algebra. The Inventiones paper also put forth two equivalent conjectures, known now as Kazhdan–Lusztig conjectures, which related the values of their polynomials at 1 with representations of complex semisimple Lie groups and Lie algebras, addressing a long-standing problem in representation theory.

Let W be a finite Weyl group. For each w ∈ W denote by M_{w} be the Verma module of highest weight −w(ρ) − ρ where ρ is the half-sum of positive roots (or Weyl vector), and let L_{w} be its irreducible quotient, the simple highest weight module of highest weight −w(ρ) − ρ. Both M_{w} and L_{w} are locally-finite weight modules over the complex semisimple Lie algebra g with the Weyl group W, and therefore admit an algebraic character. Let us write ch(X) for the character of a g-module X. The Kazhdan–Lusztig conjectures state:

$$\operatorname{ch}(L_w)=\sum_{y\le w}(-1)^{\ell(w)-\ell(y)}P_{y,w}(1)\operatorname{ch}(M_y)$$
$$\operatorname{ch}(M_w)=\sum_{y\le w}P_{w_0w,w_0y}(1)\operatorname{ch}(L_y)$$

where w_{0} is the element of maximal length of the Weyl group.

These conjectures were proved over characteristic 0 algebraically closed fields independently by Alexander Beilinson and Joseph Bernstein (1981) and by Jean-Luc Brylinski and Masaki Kashiwara (1981). The methods introduced in the course of the proof have guided development of representation theory throughout the 1980s and 1990s, under the name geometric representation theory.

=== Remarks ===
1. The two conjectures are known to be equivalent. Moreover, Borho–Jantzen's translation principle implies that w(ρ) − ρ can be replaced by w(λ + ρ) − ρ for any dominant integral weight λ. Thus, the Kazhdan–Lusztig conjectures describe the Jordan–Hölder multiplicities of Verma modules in any regular integral block of Bernstein–Gelfand–Gelfand category O.

2. A similar interpretation of all coefficients of Kazhdan–Lusztig polynomials follows from the Jantzen conjecture, which roughly says that individual coefficients of P_{y,w} are multiplicities of L_{y} in certain subquotient of the Verma module determined by a canonical filtration, the Jantzen filtration. The Jantzen conjecture in regular integral case was proved in a later paper of Beilinson and Bernstein (1993).

3. David Vogan showed as a consequence of the conjectures that

$$P_{y,w}(q) = \sum_{i} q^i \dim(\operatorname{Ext}^{\ell(w)-\ell(y)-2i}(M_y,L_w))$$

and that Ext^{j}(M_{y}, L_{w}) vanishes if j + ℓ(w) + ℓ(y) is odd, so the dimensions of all such Ext groups in category O are determined in terms of coefficients of Kazhdan–Lusztig polynomials. This result demonstrates that all coefficients of the Kazhdan–Lusztig polynomials of a finite Weyl group are non-negative integers. However, positivity for the case of a finite Weyl group W was already known from the interpretation of coefficients of the Kazhdan–Lusztig polynomials as the dimensions of intersection cohomology groups, irrespective of the conjectures. Conversely, the relation between Kazhdan–Lusztig polynomials and the Ext groups theoretically can be used to prove the conjectures, although this approach to proving them turned out to be more difficult to carry out.

4. Some special cases of the Kazhdan–Lusztig conjectures are easy to verify. For example, M_{1} is the antidominant Verma module, which is known to be simple. This means that M_{1} = L_{1}, establishing the second conjecture for w = 1, since the sum reduces to a single term. On the other hand, the first conjecture for w = w_{0} follows from the Weyl character formula and the formula for the character of a Verma module, together with the fact that all Kazhdan–Lusztig polynomials $P_{y,w_0}$ are equal to 1.

5. Kashiwara (1990) proved a generalization of the Kazhdan–Lusztig conjectures to symmetrizable Kac–Moody algebras.

6. Geordie Williamson of the University of Sydney, along with Marc Lackeby and András Juhász of the University of Oxford, have used artificial intelligence (specifically Google DeepMind) in the exploration of new conjectures in this field, particularly those pertaining to deep symmetry in higher dimensional algebra.

== Relation to intersection cohomology of Schubert varieties ==
By the Bruhat decomposition the space G/B of the algebraic group G with Weyl group W is a disjoint union of affine spaces X_{w} parameterized by elements w of W. The closures of these spaces X_{w} are called Schubert varieties, and Kazhdan and Lusztig, following a suggestion of Deligne, showed how to express Kazhdan–Lusztig polynomials in terms of intersection cohomology groups of Schubert varieties.

More precisely, the Kazhdan–Lusztig polynomial P_{y,w}(q) is equal to

$$P_{y,w}(q) = \sum_iq^i\dim IH^{2i}_{X_y}(\overline{X_w})$$

where each term on the right means: take the complex IC of sheaves whose hyperhomology is the intersection homology of the Schubert variety of w (the closure of the cell X_{w}), take its cohomology of degree 2i, and then take the dimension of the stalk of this sheaf at any point of the cell X_{y} whose closure is the Schubert variety of y. The odd-dimensional cohomology groups do not appear in the sum because they are all zero.

This gave the first proof that all coefficients of Kazhdan–Lusztig polynomials for finite Weyl groups are non-negative integers.

== Generalization to real groups ==
Lusztig–Vogan polynomials (also called Kazhdan–Lusztig polynomials or Kazhdan–Lusztig–Vogan polynomials) were introduced in Lusztig & Vogan (1983). They are analogous to Kazhdan–Lusztig polynomials, but are tailored to representations of real semisimple Lie groups, and play major role in the conjectural description of their unitary duals. Their definition is more complicated, reflecting relative complexity of representations of real groups compared to complex groups.

The distinction, in the cases directly connection to representation theory, is explained on the level of double cosets; or in other terms of actions on analogues of complex flag manifolds G/B where G is a complex Lie group and B a Borel subgroup. The original (K-L) case is then about the details of decomposing

$$B\backslash G/ B$$,

a classical theme of the Bruhat decomposition, and before that of Schubert cells in a Grassmannian. The L-V case takes a real form G_{R} of G, a maximal compact subgroup K_{R} in that semisimple group G_{R}, and makes the complexification K of K_{R}. Then the relevant object of study is

$$K\backslash G/ B$$.

In March 2007, a collaborative project, the "Atlas of Lie groups and representations", announced that the L–V polynomials had been calculated for the split form of E_{8}.

== Generalization to other objects in representation theory ==
The second paper of Kazhdan and Lusztig established a geometric setting for definition of Kazhdan–Lusztig polynomials, namely, the geometry of singularities of Schubert varieties in the flag variety. Much of the later work of Lusztig explored analogues of Kazhdan–Lusztig polynomials in the context of other natural singular algebraic varieties arising in representation theory, in particular, closures of nilpotent orbits and quiver varieties. It turned out that the representation theory of quantum groups, modular Lie algebras and affine Hecke algebras are all tightly controlled by appropriate analogues of Kazhdan–Lusztig polynomials. They admit an elementary description, but the deeper properties of these polynomials necessary for representation theory follow from sophisticated techniques of modern algebraic geometry and homological algebra, such as the use of intersection cohomology, perverse sheaves and Beilinson–Bernstein–Deligne decomposition.

The coefficients of the Kazhdan–Lusztig polynomials are conjectured to be the dimensions of some homomorphism spaces in Soergel's bimodule category. This is the only known positive interpretation of these coefficients for arbitrary Coxeter groups.

== Combinatorial theory ==
Combinatorial properties of Kazhdan–Lusztig polynomials and their generalizations are a topic of active current research. Given their significance in representation theory and algebraic geometry, attempts have been undertaken to develop the theory of Kazhdan–Lusztig polynomials in purely combinatorial fashion, relying to some extent on geometry, but without reference to intersection cohomology and other advanced techniques. This has led to exciting developments in algebraic combinatorics, such as pattern-avoidance phenomenon. Some references are given in the textbook of Björner & Brenti (2005). A research monograph on the subject is Billey & Lakshmibai (2000).

== Inequality ==
Kobayashi (2013) proved that values of Kazhdan–Lusztig polynomials at $q=1$ for crystallographic Coxeter groups satisfy certain strict inequality: Let $(W, S)$ be a crystallographic Coxeter system and ${P_{uw}(q)}$ its Kazhdan–Lusztig polynomials. If $u<w$ and $P_{uw}(1)>1$, then there exists a reflection $t$ such that $P_{uw}(1)>P_{tu, w}(1)>0$.
