= Robert Kottwitz =

American mathematician

Robert Edward Kottwitz (born 1950 in Lynn, Massachusetts) is an American mathematician.

Kottwitz studied at the University of Washington (B.A.) and then went to Harvard University, where he received his PhD in 1977 under the supervision of Phillip Griffiths and John T. Tate (Orbital Integrals on ${\rm GL}_3$). In 1976 he was assistant professor and later professor at the University of Washington and went in 1989 as a professor to the University of Chicago.

He was several times at the Institute for Advanced Study in Princeton, New Jersey (for example, in 1976 and 1977).

Kottwitz works in the Langlands program, including harmonic analysis on p-adic Lie groups and automorphic forms and the general linear groups and Shimura varieties.

He is a fellow of the American Academy of Arts and Sciences and the American Mathematical Society (AMS). He was an invited speaker at the International Congress of Mathematicians in Berlin in 1998 (Harmonic analysis on semisimple Lie p-adic algebras).

== Writings ==
- Goresky, Mark; Kottwitz, Robert; MacPherson, Robert (1998), "Equivariant cohomology, Koszul duality, and the localization theorem", Inventiones Mathematicae, 131: 25–83, doi:10.1007/s002220050197, S2CID 6006856
- With Diana Shelstad Foundations of Twisted Endoscopy, Astérisque, 255, 1999
- With James Arthur, David Ellwood (editor): Harmonic analysis, the trace formula and Shimura varieties, Proc. Clay Mathematics Institute, 2003 Summer School, The Fields Institute, Toronto, June 2003, AMS 2005
