= Satake =

Satake may refer to:

- Satake clan, a Japanese samurai clan originally from Hitachi Province
- Satake Corporation, a multinational agricultural equipment maker based in Hiroshima, Japan
- Asteroid 8194 Satake
- Ichirō Satake (1927–2014), Japanese mathematician
  - Satake isomorphism
  - Satake diagram
- Misako Satake (佐竹 美佐子, born 1951), Japanese women's basketball player
- Mitsuko Satake (佐竹 美都子, born 1976), Japanese sailor
- Norihisa Satake (佐竹 敬久, born 1947), Japanese politician
