= Fundamental lemma (Langlands program) =

Theorem in abstract algebra

In the mathematical theory of automorphic forms, the fundamental lemma relates orbital integrals on a reductive group over a local field to stable orbital integrals on its endoscopic groups. It was conjectured by Robert Langlands (1983) in the course of developing the Langlands program. The fundamental lemma was proved by Gérard Laumon and Ngô Bảo Châu in the case of unitary groups and then by Ngô (2010) for general reductive groups, building on a series of important reductions made by Jean-Loup Waldspurger to the case of Lie algebras. Time magazine placed Ngô's proof on the list of the "Top 10 scientific discoveries of 2009". In 2010, Ngô was awarded the Fields Medal for this proof.

== Motivation and history ==
Langlands outlined a strategy for proving local and global Langlands conjectures using the Arthur–Selberg trace formula, but in order for this approach to work, the geometric sides of the trace formula for different groups must be related in a particular way. This relationship takes the form of identities between orbital integrals on reductive groups G and H over a nonarchimedean local field F, where the group H, called an endoscopic group of G, is constructed from G and some additional data.

The first case considered was $G = {\rm SL}_2$ (Labesse & Langlands 1979). Langlands and Diana Shelstad (1987) then developed the general framework for the theory of endoscopic transfer and formulated specific conjectures. However, during the next two decades only partial progress was made towards proving the fundamental lemma. Harris called it a "bottleneck limiting progress on a host of arithmetic questions". Langlands himself, writing on the origins of endoscopy, commented:

... it is not the fundamental lemma as such that is critical for the analytic theory of automorphic forms and for the arithmetic of Shimura varieties; it is the stabilized (or stable) trace formula, the reduction of the trace formula itself to the stable trace formula for a group and its endoscopic groups, and the stabilization of the Grothendieck–Lefschetz formula. None of these are possible without the fundamental lemma and its absence rendered progress almost impossible for more than twenty years.

== Statement ==
The fundamental lemma states that an orbital integral O for a group G is equal to a stable orbital integral SO for an endoscopic group H, up to a transfer factor Δ (Nadler 2012):

$$SO_{\gamma_H}(1_{K_H}) = \Delta(\gamma_H,\gamma_G)O^\kappa_{\gamma_G}(1_{K_G})$$

where

- F is a local field,
- G is an unramified group defined over F, in other words a quasi-split reductive group defined over F that splits over an unramified extension of F,
- H is an unramified endoscopic group of G associated to κ,
- K_{G} and K_{H} are hyperspecial maximal compact subgroups of G and H, which means roughly that they are the subgroups of points with coefficients in the ring of integers of F,
- 1_{K_{G}} and 1_{K_{H}} are the characteristic functions of K_{G} and K_{H},
- Δ(γ_{H},γ_{G}) is a transfer factor, a certain elementary expression depending on γ_{H} and γ_{G},
- γ_{H} and γ_{G} are elements of G and H representing stable conjugacy classes, such that the stable conjugacy class of G is the transfer of the stable conjugacy class of H,
- κ is a character of the group of conjugacy classes in the stable conjugacy class of γ_{G},
- SO and O are stable orbital integrals and orbital integrals depending on their parameters.

== Approaches ==
Shelstad (1982) proved the fundamental lemma for Archimedean fields.

Waldspurger (1991) verified the fundamental lemma for general linear groups.

Kottwitz (1992) and Blasius & Rogawski (1992) verified some cases of the fundamental lemma for 3-dimensional unitary groups.

Hales (1997) and Weissauer (2009) verified the fundamental lemma for the symplectic and general symplectic groups Sp_{4}, GSp_{4}.

A paper of Mark Goresky, Robert Kottwitz and Robert MacPherson pointed out that orbital integrals could be interpreted as counting points on affine Springer fibers over finite fields. Further, the integrals in question can be computed in a way that depends only on the residue field of F; and the issue can be reduced to the Lie algebra version of the orbital integrals. The problem was restated in terms of the Springer fiber of algebraic groups. The circle of ideas was connected to the purity conjecture; Goresky, Kottwitz and MacPherson gave a conditional proof for unramified tori, based on this conjecture while Laumon gave a conditional proof for unitary groups. Laumon and Ngô (2008) then proved the fundamental lemma for unitary groups, using Hitchin fibration introduced by Ngô (2006), which is an abstract geometric analogue of the Hitchin system of complex algebraic geometry. Waldspurger (2006) showed for Lie algebras that the function field case implies the fundamental lemma over all local fields, and Waldspurger (2008) showed that the fundamental lemma for Lie algebras implies the fundamental lemma for groups.
