= Springer correspondence =

In mathematics, the Springer representations are certain representations of the Weyl group W associated to unipotent conjugacy classes of a semisimple algebraic group G. There is another parameter involved, a representation of a certain finite group A(u) canonically determined by the unipotent conjugacy class. To each pair (u, φ) consisting of a unipotent element u of G and an irreducible representation φ of A(u), one can associate either an irreducible representation of the Weyl group, or 0. The association

$$(u,\phi) \mapsto E_{u,\phi} \quad u\in U(G), \phi\in\widehat{A(u)}, E_{u,\phi}\in\widehat{W}$$

depends only on the conjugacy class of u and generates a correspondence between the irreducible representations of the Weyl group and the pairs (u, φ) modulo conjugation, called the Springer correspondence. It is known that every irreducible representation of W occurs exactly once in the correspondence, although φ may be a non-trivial representation. The Springer correspondence has been described explicitly in all cases by Lusztig, Spaltenstein and Shoji. The correspondence, along with its generalizations due to Lusztig, plays a key role in Lusztig's classification of the irreducible representations of finite groups of Lie type.

== Construction ==
Several approaches to Springer correspondence have been developed. T. A. Springer's original construction proceeded by defining an action of W on the top-dimensional l-adic cohomology groups of the algebraic variety B_{u} of the Borel subgroups of G containing a given unipotent element u of a semisimple algebraic group G over a finite field. This construction was generalized by Lusztig, who also eliminated some technical assumptions. Springer later gave a different construction, using the ordinary cohomology with rational coefficients and complex algebraic groups.

Kazhdan and Lusztig found a topological construction of Springer representations using the Steinberg variety and, allegedly, discovered Kazhdan–Lusztig polynomials in the process. Generalized Springer correspondence has been studied by Lusztig and Spaltenstein and by Lusztig in his work on character sheaves. Borho and MacPherson proved some properties of the Springer correspondence.

== Example ==
For the special linear group SL_{n}, the unipotent conjugacy classes are parametrized by partitions of n: if u is a unipotent element, the corresponding partition is given by the sizes of the Jordan blocks of u. All groups A(u) are trivial.

The Weyl group W is the symmetric group S_{n} on n letters. Its irreducible representations over a field of characteristic zero are also parametrized by the partitions of n. The Springer correspondence in this case is a bijection, and in the standard parametrizations, it is given by transposition of the partitions (so that the trivial representation of the Weyl group corresponds to the regular unipotent class, and the sign representation corresponds to the identity element of G).

== Applications ==
Springer correspondence turned out to be closely related to the classification of primitive ideals in the universal enveloping algebra of a complex semisimple Lie algebra, both as a general principle and as a technical tool. Many important results are due to Anthony Joseph. A geometric approach was developed by Borho, Brylinski, and MacPherson.
