= Mixed Hodge module =

Mathematical concept

In mathematics, mixed Hodge modules are the culmination of Hodge theory, mixed Hodge structures, intersection cohomology, and the decomposition theorem yielding a coherent framework for discussing variations of degenerating mixed Hodge structures through the six functor formalism. Essentially, these objects are a pair of a filtered D-module $(M, F^\bullet)$ together with a perverse sheaf $\mathcal{F}$ such that the functor from the Riemann–Hilbert correspondence sends $(M, F^\bullet)$ to $\mathcal{F}$. This makes it possible to construct a Hodge structure on intersection cohomology, one of the key problems when the subject was discovered. This was solved by Morihiko Saito who found a way to use the filtration on a coherent D-module as an analogue of the Hodge filtration for a Hodge structure. This made it possible to give a Hodge structure on an intersection cohomology sheaf, the simple objects in the Abelian category of perverse sheaves.

== Abstract structure ==
Before going into the nitty gritty details of defining mixed Hodge modules, which is quite elaborate, it is useful to get a sense of what the category of mixed Hodge modules actually provides. Given a complex algebraic variety $X$ there is an abelian category $\textbf{MHM}(X)$^{pg 339} with the following functorial properties

1. There is a faithful functor $\text{rat}_X:\textbf{MHM}(X) \to \textbf{Perv}(X;\mathbb{Q})$ called the rationalization functor. This gives the underlying rational perverse sheaf of a mixed Hodge module.
2. There is a faithful functor $\text{Dmod}_X:\textbf{MHM}(X) \to \textbf{Mod}(\mathcal{D}_X)$ sending a mixed Hodge module to its underlying D-module.
3. These functors behave well with respect to the Riemann-Hilbert correspondence $DR_X:D^b_{Coh}(\mathcal{D}_X) \to D^b_{cs}(X;\mathbb{C})$, meaning for every mixed Hodge module $M$ there is an isomorphism $\alpha: \text{rat}_X(M)\otimes \mathbb{C} \xrightarrow{\sim} \text{DR}_X(\text{Dmod}_X(M))$.

In addition, there are the following categorical properties

1. The category of mixed Hodge modules over a point is isomorphic to the category of Mixed hodge structures, $\textbf{MHM}(\{pt\}) \cong \text{MHS}$
2. Every object $M$ in $\textbf{MHM}(X)$ admits a weight filtration $W$ such that every morphism in $\textbf{MHM}(X)$ preserves the weight filtration strictly, the associated graded objects $\text{Gr}_k^W(M)$ are semi-simple, and in the category of mixed Hodge modules over a point, this corresponds to the weight filtration of a mixed Hodge structure.
3. There is a dualizing functor $\mathbb{D}_X$ lifting the Verdier dualizing functor in $D^b_{cs}(X;\mathbb{Q})$ which is an involution on $\textbf{MHM}(X)$.

For a morphism $f:X \to Y$ of algebraic varieties, the associated six functors on $D^b\textbf{MHM}(X)$ and $D^b\textbf{MHM}(Y)$ have the following properties

1. $f_!,f^*$ don't increase the weights of a complex $M^\bullet$ of mixed Hodge modules.
2. $f^!,f_*$ don't decrease the weights of a complex $M^\bullet$ of mixed Hodge modules.

=== Relation between derived categories ===
The derived category of mixed Hodge modules $D^b\textbf{MHM}(X)$ is intimately related to the derived category of constructible sheaves $D^b_{cs}(X;\mathbb{Q}) \cong D^b(\text{Perv}(X;\mathbb{Q}))$ equivalent to the derived category of perverse sheaves. This is because of how the rationalization functor is compatible with the cohomology functor $H^k$ of a complex $M^\bullet$ of mixed Hodge modules. When taking the rationalization, there is an isomorphism

$\text{rat}_X(H^k(M^\bullet)) = \text{ }^\mathbf{p}H^k(\text{rat}_X(M^\bullet))$

for the middle perversity $\mathbb{p}$. Note^{pg 310} this is the function $\mathbf{p}:2\mathbb{N} \to \mathbb{Z}$ sending $\mathbf{p}(2k) = -k$, which differs from the case of pseudomanifolds where the perversity is a function $\mathbb{p}:[2,n] \to \mathbb{Z}_{\geq 0}$ where $\mathbf{p}(2k)=\mathbf{p}(2k - 1) = k-1$. Recall this is defined as taking the composition of perverse truncations with the shift functor, so^{pg 341}

$\text{ }^\mathbf{p}H^k(\text{rat}_X(M^\bullet)) = \text{ }^{\mathbf{p}}\tau_{\leq 0}\text{ }^{\mathbf{p}}\tau_{\geq 0} (\text{rat}_X(M^\bullet)[+k])$

This kind of setup is also reflected in the derived push and pull functors $f_!,f^*,f^!,f_*$ and with nearby and vanishing cycles $\psi_f, \phi_f$, the rationalization functor takes these to their analogous perverse functors on the derived category of perverse sheaves.

=== Tate modules and cohomology ===
Here we denote the canonical projection to a point by $p:X \to \{pt\}$. One of the first mixed Hodge modules available is the weight 0 Tate object, denoted $\underline{\mathbb{Q}}_X^{Hdg}$ which is defined as the pullback of its corresponding object in $\mathbb{Q}^{Hdg} \in \textbf{MHM}(\{pt\})$, so

$\underline{\mathbb{Q}}_X^{Hdg} = p^*\mathbb{Q}^{Hdg}$

The Hodge structure $\mathbb{Q}^{Hdg}$ corresponds to the weight 0 Tate object $\mathbb{Q}(0)$ in the category of mixed Hodge structures. This object is useful because it can be used to compute the various cohomologies of $X$ through the six functor formalism and give them a mixed Hodge structure. These can be summarized with the table

$$\begin{matrix}
H^k(X;\mathbb{Q}) &= H^k(\{pt\}, p_*p^*\mathbb{Q}^{Hdg}) \\
H^k_c(X;\mathbb{Q}) &= H^k(\{pt\}, p_!p^*\mathbb{Q}^{Hdg}) \\
H_{-k}(X;\mathbb{Q}) &= H^k(\{pt\}, p_!p^!\mathbb{Q}^{Hdg}) \\
H_{-k}^{BM}(X;\mathbb{Q}) &= H^k(\{pt\}, p_!p^*\mathbb{Q}^{Hdg})
\end{matrix}$$

Moreover, given a closed embedding $i: Z \to X$ there is the local cohomology group

$H^k_Z(X;\mathbb{Q}) = H^k(\{pt\}, p_*i_*i^!\underline{\mathbb{Q}}_X^{Hdg})$

=== Variations of Mixed Hodge structures ===
For a morphism of varieties $f:X \to Y$ the pushforward maps $f_*\underline{\mathbb{Q}}^{Hdg}_X$ and $f_!\underline{\mathbb{Q}}^{Hdg}_X$ give degenerating variations of mixed Hodge structures on $Y$. In order to better understand these variations, the decomposition theorem and intersection cohomology are required.

=== Intersection cohomology ===
One of the defining features of the category of mixed Hodge modules is the fact intersection cohomology can be phrased in its language. This makes it possible to use the decomposition theorem for maps $f:X \to Y$ of varieties. To define the intersection complex, let $j : U \hookrightarrow X$ be the open smooth part of a variety $X$. Then the intersection complex of $X$ can be defined as

$IC_X^\bullet\mathbb{Q}^{Hdg} := j_{!*}\underline{\mathbb{Q}}_U^{Hdg}[d_X]$

where

$j_{!*}(\underline{\mathbb{Q}}_U^{Hdg}) = \operatorname{Image}[j_!(\underline{\mathbb{Q}}_U^{Hdg}) \to j_*(\underline{\mathbb{Q}}_U^{Hdg})]$

as with perverse sheaves^{pg 311}. In particular, this setup can be used to show the intersection cohomology groups

$IH^k(X) = H^k(p_*IC^\bullet\underline{\mathbb{Q}}_X)$

have a pure weight $k$ Hodge structure.

== See also ==
- Mixed motives (math)
- Deligne cohomology
