= Alexander Braverman =

Israeli mathematician

- Александр Эммануилович Браверман
- Born: June 8, 1974 (age 52)
- Education: Tel Aviv University
- Known for: Geometric Langlands program
- Scientific career
- Fields: Mathematics
- Workplaces: University of Toronto, Perimeter Institute for Theoretical Physics
- Doctoral advisor: Joseph Bernstein

Alexander Emmanuilovich Braverman (Russian: Александр Эммануилович Браверман, Hebrew: אלכסנדר ברוורמן; born June 8, 1974) is an Israeli mathematician.

== Life and work ==
Braverman was born in Moscow.. He earned in 1993 a BA degree in mathematics from the University of Tel Aviv, where in 1998 he received a Ph.D. (Kazhdan-Laumon Representations of Finite Chevalley Groups, Character Sheaves and Some Generalization of the Lefschetz-Verdier Trace Formula) under supervision of Joseph Bernstein. From 1997 to 1999 he was a C.L.E. Moore instructor at Massachusetts Institute of Technology and in 2004 Benjamin Peirce Lecturer at Harvard University. He was an associate professor at Brown University from 2004 to 2009 and then a full professor from 2009 to 2015. He is a full professor at University of Toronto since 2015 and an associate faculty member at Perimeter Institute for Theoretical Physics. He was also a visiting scholar at Institute for Advanced Study (1997, 1999), the University of Paris VI and the Paris-Nord, the Hebrew University in Jerusalem, the Weizmann Institute, Clay Mathematics Institute and at the IHES in Paris.

Braverman specializes in the geometric Langlands program, the intersection of number theory, algebraic geometry and representation theory, which also has applications to mathematical physics.

In 2006 he was an invited speaker at the International Congress of Mathematicians in Madrid (Spaces of quasi-maps into the flag varieties and their applications).
