= Shelstad =

Shelstad is a surname. Notable people with the surname include:

- Brad Shelstad (born 1952), American ice hockey player
- Diana Shelstad (born 1947), Australian mathematician
- Jackson Shelstad (born 2005), American basketball player
