= Perverse sheaf =

Objects of certain abelian categories associated to topological spaces

The mathematical term perverse sheaves refers to the objects of certain abelian categories associated to topological spaces, which may be a real or complex manifold, or more general topologically stratified spaces, possibly singular.

The concept was introduced in the work of Joseph Bernstein, Alexander Beilinson, and Pierre Deligne and Ofer Gabber (1982) as a consequence of the Riemann-Hilbert correspondence, which establishes a connection between the derived category of regular holonomic D-modules and the derived category of constructible sheaves. Perverse sheaves are the objects in the latter that correspond to individual D-modules (and not more general complexes thereof); a perverse sheaf is in general represented by a complex of sheaves. The concept of perverse sheaves is already implicit in a 75's paper of Kashiwara on the constructibility of solutions of holonomic D-modules.

A key observation was that the intersection homology of Mark Goresky and Robert MacPherson could be described using sheaf complexes that are actually perverse sheaves. It was clear from the outset that perverse sheaves are fundamental mathematical objects at the crossroads of algebraic geometry, topology, analysis and differential equations. They also play an important role in number theory, algebra, and representation theory.

== Preliminary remarks ==
The name perverse sheaf comes through rough translation of the French "faisceaux pervers". The justification is that perverse sheaves are complexes of sheaves which have several features in common with sheaves: they form an abelian category, they have cohomology, and to construct one, it suffices to construct it locally everywhere. The adjective "perverse" originates in the intersection homology theory, and its origin was explained by Goresky (2010).

The Beilinson–Bernstein–Deligne-Gabber definition of a perverse sheaf proceeds through the machinery of triangulated categories in homological algebra and has a very strong algebraic flavour, although the main examples arising from Goresky–MacPherson theory are topological in nature because the simple objects in the category of perverse sheaves are the intersection cohomology complexes. This motivated MacPherson to recast the whole theory in geometric terms on a basis of Morse theory. For many applications in representation theory, perverse sheaves can be treated as a 'black box', a category with certain formal properties.

== Definition and examples ==
A perverse sheaf is an object C of the bounded derived category of sheaves with constructible cohomology on a space X such that the set of points x with

$H^{-i}(j_x^*C)\ne 0$ or $H^{i}(j_x^!C)\ne 0$

has real dimension at most 2i, for all i. Here j_{x} is the inclusion map of the point x.

If X is a smooth complex algebraic variety and everywhere of dimension d, then

$$\mathcal F[d]$$

is a perverse sheaf for any local system $\mathcal F$. If X is a flat, locally complete intersection (for example, regular) scheme over a henselian discrete valuation ring, then the constant sheaf shifted by $\dim X+1$ is an étale perverse sheaf.

== A simple example ==
Let X be a disk around the origin in $\mathbb{C}$ stratified so that the origin is the unique singular stratum. Then the category of perverse sheaves on X is equivalent to the category of diagrams of vector spaces $V \overset{u}\underset{v}\rightleftarrows W$ where $\operatorname{id} - u \circ v$ and $\operatorname{id} - v \circ u$ are invertible. More generally, quivers can be used to describe perverse sheaves.

== Properties ==
The category of perverse sheaves is an abelian subcategory of the (non-abelian) derived category of sheaves, equal to the core of a suitable t-structure, and is preserved by Verdier duality.

The bounded derived category of perverse l-adic sheaves on a scheme X is equivalent to the derived category of constructible sheaves and similarly for sheaves on the complex analytic space associated to a scheme X/C.

== Applications ==
Perverse sheaves are a fundamental tool for the geometry of singular spaces. Therefore, they are applied in a variety of mathematical areas. In the Riemann-Hilbert correspondence, perverse sheaves correspond to regular holonomic D-modules. This application establishes the notion of perverse sheaf as occurring 'in nature'. The decomposition theorem, a far-reaching extension of the hard Lefschetz theorem decomposition, requires the usage of perverse sheaves. Hodge modules are, roughly speaking, a Hodge-theoretic refinement of perverse sheaves. The geometric Satake equivalence identifies equivariant perverse sheaves on the affine Grassmannian $Gr_G$ with representations of the Langlands dual group of a reductive group G - see Mirković & Vilonen (2007). A proof of the Weil conjectures using perverse sheaves is given in Kiehl & Weissauer (2001).

== String theory ==
Massless fields in superstring compactifications have been identified with cohomology classes on the target space (i.e. four-dimensional Minkowski space with a six-dimensional Calabi-Yau (CY) manifold). The determination of the matter and interaction content requires a detailed analysis of the (co)homology of these spaces: nearly all massless fields in the effective physics model are represented by certain (co)homology elements.

However, a troubling consequence occurs when the target space is singular. A singular target space means that only the CY manifold part is singular as the Minkowski space factor is smooth. Such a singular CY manifold is called a conifold as it is a CY manifold that admits conical singularities.

Andrew Strominger observed (A. Strominger, 1995) that conifolds correspond to massless blackholes. Conifolds are important objects in string theory: Brian Greene explains the physics of conifolds in Chapter 13 of his book The Elegant Universe —including the fact that the space can tear near the cone, and its topology can change. These singular target spaces, i.e. conifolds, correspond to certain mild degenerations of algebraic varieties which appear in a large class of supersymmetric theories, including superstring theory (E. Witten, 1982).

Essentially, different cohomology theories on singular target spaces yield different results thereby making it difficult to determine which theory physics may favor. Several important characteristics of the cohomology, which correspond to the massless fields, are based on general properties of field theories, specifically, the (2,2)-supersymmetric 2-dimensional world-sheet field theories. These properties, known as the Kähler package (T. Hubsch, 1992), should hold for singular and smooth target spaces. Paul Green and Tristan Hubsch (P. Green & T. Hubsch, 1988) determined that the manner in which you move between singular CY target spaces require moving through either a small resolution or deformation of the singularity (T. Hubsch, 1992) and called it the 'conifold transition'.

Tristan Hubsch (T. Hubsch, 1997) conjectured what this cohomology theory should be for singular target spaces. Tristan Hubsch and Abdul Rahman (T. Hubsch and A. Rahman, 2005) worked to solve the Hubsch conjecture by analyzing the non-transversal case of Witten's gauged linear sigma model (E. Witten, 1993) which induces a stratification of these algebraic varieties (termed the ground state variety) in the case of isolated conical singularities.

Under certain conditions it was determined that this ground state variety was a conifold (P. Green & T.Hubsch, 1988; T. Hubsch, 1992) with isolated conic singularities over a certain base with a 1-dimensional exocurve (termed exo-strata) attached at each singular point. T. Hubsch and A. Rahman determined the (co)-homology of this ground state variety in all dimensions, found it compatible with Mirror symmetry and String Theory but found an obstruction in the middle dimension (T. Hubsch and A. Rahman, 2005). This obstruction required revisiting Hubsch's conjecture of a Stringy Singular Cohomology (T. Hubsch, 1997). In the winter of 2002, T. Hubsch and A. Rahman met with R.M. Goresky to discuss this obstruction and in discussions between R.M. Goresky and R. MacPherson, R. MacPherson made the observation that there was such a perverse sheaf that could have the cohomology that satisfied Hubsch's conjecture and resolved the obstruction. R.M. Goresky and T. Hubsch advised A. Rahman's Ph.D. dissertation on the construction of a self-dual perverse sheaf (A. Rahman, 2009) using the zig-zag construction of MacPherson-Vilonen (R. MacPherson & K. Vilonen, 1986). This perverse sheaf proved the Hübsch conjecture for isolated conic singularities, satisfied Poincaré duality, and aligned with some of the properties of the Kähler package. Satisfaction of all of the Kähler package by this Perverse sheaf for higher codimension strata is still an open problem. Markus Banagl (M. Banagl, 2010; M. Banagl, et al., 2014) addressed the Hubsch conjecture through intersection spaces for higher codimension strata inspired by Hubsch's work (T. Hubsch, 1992, 1997; P. Green and T. Hubsch, 1988) and A. Rahman's original ansatz (A. Rahman, 2009) for isolated singularities.

== See also ==
- Mixed Hodge module
- Mixed perverse sheaf
- Intersection homology
- L² cohomology
- Conifold
- String Theory
- Supersymmetry
