= David Nadler =

David Nadler may refer to:

- David Nadler (mathematician) (born 1973), American mathematician
- David A. Nadler (1948–2015), American organizational theorist
