= Zoghman Mebkhout =

French-Algerian mathematician (born 1949)

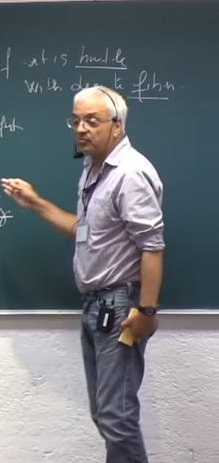
- Zoghman Mebkhout at CIMAT
- Born: 1949 (age 76–77); Mécheria, Algeria
- Education: University of Paris 7
- Known for: Perverse sheaves
- Scientific career
- Workplaces: IMJ-PRG
- Thesis: Local cohomology of complex analytical spaces (1979)

Zoghman Mebkhout (born 1949 ) (زغمان مبخوت) is a French-Algerian mathematician. He is known for his work in algebraic analysis, geometry and representation theory, more precisely on the theory of D-modules.

== Career ==
Mebkhout is currently a research director at the French National Centre for Scientific Research and in 2002 Zoghman received the Servant Medal from the CNRS a prize given every two years with an amount of €10,000.

== Notable works ==
In September 1979 Mebkhout presented the Riemann–Hilbert correspondence, which is a generalization of Hilbert's twenty-first problem to higher dimensions. The original setting was for Riemann surfaces, where it was about the existence of regular differential equations with prescribed monodromy groups.

In higher dimensions, Riemann surfaces are replaced by complex manifolds of dimension > 1. Certain systems of partial differential equations (linear and having very special properties for their solutions) and possible monodromies of their solutions correspond. An independent proof of this result was presented by Masaki Kashiwara in April 1980.

Zoghman is now largely known as a specialist in D-modules theory.

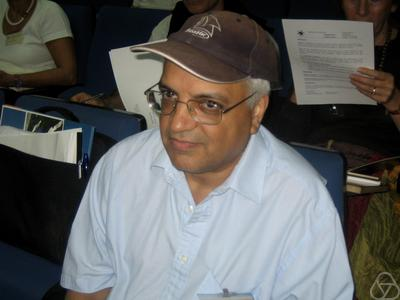
Zoghman Mebkhout

== Recognition ==
Zoghman is one of the first modern international-caliber North-African mathematicians. A symposium in Spain was held on his sixtieth birthday. He was invited to the Institute for Advanced Study and gave a recent talk at Institut Fourier.

In his quasi-autobiographical text Récoltes et semailles Alexander Grothendieck wrote extensively about what he for a time thought of as gross mistreatment of Mebkhout, in particular in the context of attribution of credit for the formulation and proof of the Riemann-Hilbert correspondence. However, in May 1986, after being contacted by a number of mathematicians involved in the matter, Grothendieck retracted his former viewpoints (that had been based on direct testimony of Mebkhout) in a number of additions to the manuscript. They were not included in the first edition of the book by Éditions Gallimard, but were added in the later "augmented" edition.
