= T. A. Springer =

Dutch mathematician

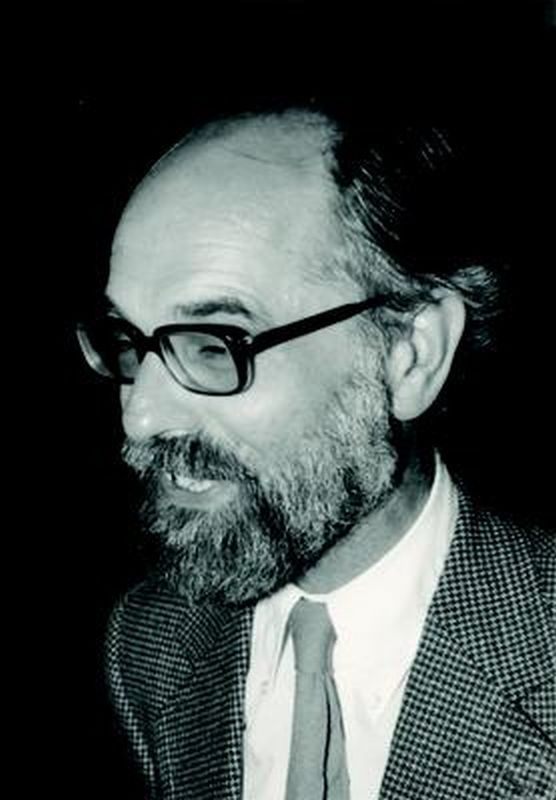
- T. A. Springer, 1973 in Erlangen
- Born: 13 February 1926; The Hague
- Died: 7 December 2011 (aged 85); Zeist
- Education: Leiden University
- Scientific career
- Fields: Mathematics
- Workplaces: Utrecht University
- Doctoral advisor: Hendrik Kloosterman
- Doctoral students: Gerrit van Dijk; Wilberd van der Kallen; Marc van Leeuwen

Tonny Albert Springer (13 February 1926 – 7 December 2011) was a mathematician at Utrecht University who worked on linear algebraic groups, Hecke algebras, complex reflection groups, and who introduced Springer representations and the Springer resolution.

Springer began his undergraduate studies in 1945 at Leiden University and remained there for his graduate work in mathematics, earning his PhD in 1951 under Hendrik Kloosterman with thesis Over symplectische Transformaties. As a postdoc Springer spent the academic year 1951/1952 at the University of Nancy and then returned to Leiden University, where he was employed until 1955. In 1955 he accepted a lectureship at Utrecht University, where he became professor ordinarius in 1959 and continued in that position until 1991 when he retired as professor emeritus. Springer's visiting professorships included many institutions: the University of Göttingen (1963), the Institute for Advanced Study (1961/1962, 1969, 1983), IHES (1964, 1973, 1975, 1983), Tata Institute of Fundamental Research (1968, 1980), UCLA (1965/1966), the Australian National University, the University of Sydney, the University of Rome Tor Vergata, the University of Basel, the Erwin Schrödinger Institute in Vienna, and the University of Paris VI.

In 1964 Springer was elected to the Royal Netherlands Academy of Arts and Sciences. In 2006 in Madrid he was an invited speaker at the International Congress of Mathematicians with lecture on Some results on compactifications of semisimple groups. (At the 1962 ICM in Stockholm he made a short contribution Twisted composition algebras, but was not an invited speaker.)

== Publications ==
- Springer, Tonny A. (1998), Jordan Algebras and Algebraic Groups, Classics in Mathematics, Springer-Verlag, ISBN 3-540-63632-3 Reprint of the 1973 edition.
- Springer, Tonny A.; Veldkamp, Ferdinand D. (2000), Octonions, Jordan Algebras, and Exceptional Groups, Springer Monographs in Mathematics, Berlin: Springer, ISBN 3-540-66337-1
- Springer, Tonny A. (1998), Linear algebraic groups (2nd ed.), Birkhäuser, ISBN 978-0-8176-4021-7; 1st edition. 1981.
- Springer, Tonny A. (1977), Invariant theory, Lecture Notes in Mathematics, vol. 585, Springer-Verlag
