= Roman Bezrukavnikov =

American mathematician (born 1973)

- Роман Безрукавников
- Born: July 1, 1973 (age 53); Moscow, Russia
- Education: Moscow State University; Brandeis University; Tel Aviv University
- Awards: Clay Research Fellowship (2001); Simons Research Fellowship (2014, 2020); Sloan Fellowship (2004)
- Scientific career
- Fields: Mathematics
- Workplaces: Northwestern University; Massachusetts Institute of Technology
- Thesis: Homology Properties of Representations of p-adic groups Related to Geometry of the Group at Infinity (1998)
- Doctoral advisor: Joseph Bernstein
- Website: math.mit.edu/~bezrukav/

Roman Vladimirovich Bezrukavnikov (Russian: Роман Безрукавников; born July 1, 1973) is a Russian-American mathematician born in Moscow. He is a mathematics professor at the Massachusetts Institute of Technology and the chief research fellow at the HSE International Laboratory of Representation Theory and Mathematical Physics who specializes in representation theory and algebraic geometry.

== Education and career ==
He graduated from Moscow State School 57 mathematical class in 1990, and earned an M.A. at Brandeis University in 1994. He received his Ph.D. in mathematics from Tel Aviv University in 1998 under the supervision of Joseph N. Bernstein.

Bezrukavnikov was a visiting scholar at the Institute for Advanced Study in 1996-1998 and again in 2007–2008. He was a Dickson Instructor at the University of Chicago in 1999-2001. In 2001 he was awarded a Clay Research Fellowship, and in 2004, he won a Sloan Research Fellowship from the Alfred P. Sloan Foundation. He was awarded a Simons Fellowship in Mathematics by the Simons Foundation in 2014, and again in 2020.
