= Gérard Laumon =

French mathematician (1952–2025)

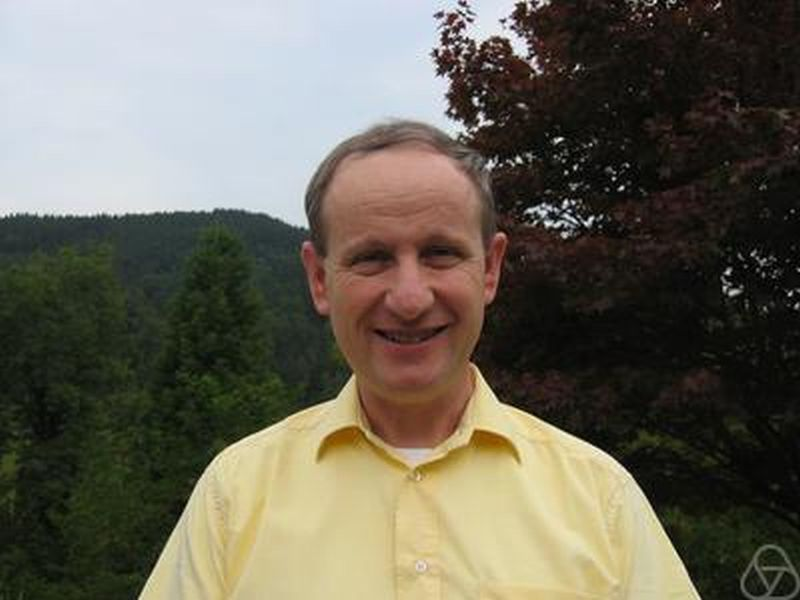
- Laumon in 2004
- Born: 1952; Lyon, France
- Died: 4 October 2025 (aged 72–73)
- Education: École Normale Supérieure; Paris-Sud 11 University
- Known for: Work on Langlands program
- Awards: Clay Research Award (2004)
- Scientific career
- Fields: Mathematics
- Workplaces: Paris-Sud 11 University
- Doctoral advisor: Luc Illusie
- Doctoral students: Laurent Lafforgue; Ngô Bảo Châu; Sophie Morel

Gérard Laumon (French: [lomɔ̃]; 1952 – 4 October 2025) was a French mathematician working in number theory and the Langlands program.

== Background ==
Laumon was born in 1952. He studied at the École Normale Supérieure and Paris-Sud 11 University, Orsay. Laumon died on 4 October 2025.

== Work ==
In 1987, Vladimir Drinfeld and Laumon formulated the geometric Langlands conjecture for general linear groups $GL(n,K)$ over a function field $K$.

In 2008, Laumon and Ngô Bảo Châu proved the fundamental lemma for unitary groups, a component in the Langlands program in number theory.

== Awards ==
Laumon was awarded the Silver Medal of the CNRS in 1987, the E. Dechelle prize of the French Academy of the Sciences in 1992, and the Clay Research Award in 2004. Laumon and Ngô received the Clay Research Award for the proof of the fundamental lemma for unitary groups, a component in the Langlands program in number theory, in 2004.

In 2012, he became a fellow of the American Mathematical Society.
