= Endoscopic group =

Mathematical group

In mathematics, endoscopic groups of reductive algebraic groups were introduced by Robert Langlands (1979, 1983) in his work on the stable trace formula.

Roughly speaking, an endoscopic group H of G is a quasi-split group whose L-group is the connected component of the centralizer of a semisimple element of the L-group of G.

In the stable trace formula, unstable orbital integrals on a group G correspond to stable orbital integrals on its endoscopic groups H. The relation between them is given by the fundamental lemma.
