= Diana Shelstad =

Australian mathematician

- Born: August 19, 1947 (age 79); Sydney, Australia
- Education: Yale University
- Known for: Coconjecturing the fundamental lemma
- Scientific career
- Fields: Mathematics
- Workplaces: Rutgers University–Newark
- Doctoral advisor: Robert Langlands

Diana Frost Shelstad (born August 19, 1947 in Sydney) is a mathematician known for her work in automorphic forms. She is a professor at Rutgers University–Newark. She earned her doctorate at Yale University in 1974 studying real reductive algebraic groups.

== Research ==
Shelstad has been a key player in the development of the theory of endoscopy which is part of Langlands program. She co-conjectured the fundamental lemma with Robert Langlands in 1984. After over 20 years, this conjecture was solved by Ngô Bảo Châu in 2009, thus opening up a wealth of consequences.

In 1999, Shelstad developed a theory of twisted endoscopy with Robert Kottwitz. In 2008–9 she completed work on tempered endoscopy.

== Awards and honors ==
In 2012 she became a fellow of the American Mathematical Society.

== Selected papers ==
- Shelstad, D. Characters and inner forms of a quasi-split group over $\R$. Compositio Mathematica, 39 (1979), no. 1, 11–45.
- Langlands, R.; Shelstad, D. On principal values on p-adic manifolds. Lie group representations, II (College Park, Md., 1982/1983), 250–279, Lecture Notes in Math., 1041, Springer, Berlin, 1984.
- Kottwitz, R. and D. Shelstad Foundations of Twisted Endoscopy, Asterisque, vol. 255, 1999
- Shelstad, D. On geometric transfer in real twisted endoscopy. Annals of Mathematics 176 (2012), no. 3, 1919-1985.
