= Morihiko =

- Gender: Male

Origin
- Origin: Japanese
- Meaning: Different meanings depending on the kanji used

Morihiko (written: 守彦) is a masculine Japanese given name. Notable people with the name include:

- Morihiko Hiramatsu (平松 守彦; born 1924), Japanese politician
- Morihiko Nakahara (born 1975), Japanese conductor
- Morihiko Saito (斎藤 盛彦; born 1961), Japanese mathematician
