= Dennis Gaitsgory =

Israeli-American mathematician

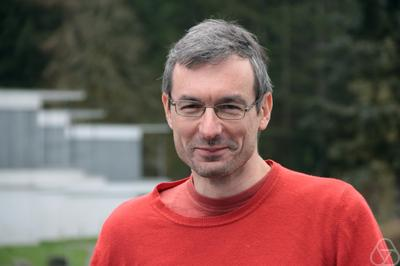
- Gaitsgory in 2016
- Born: 17 November 1973 (age 52); Chișinău, Moldovan SSR, Soviet Union
- Education: Tel Aviv University
- Awards: EMS Prize (2000); Chevalley Prize (2018); Breakthrough Prize in Mathematics (2025)
- Scientific career
- Fields: Mathematics
- Workplaces: Max Planck Institute for Mathematics; Harvard University; University of Chicago
- Doctoral advisor: Joseph Bernstein

Dennis Gaitsgory (born 17 November 1973) is an Israeli-American mathematician. He is a mathematician at Max Planck Institute for Mathematics (MPIM) at Bonn and is known for his research on the geometric Langlands program.

== Life and career ==
Born in Chișinău (now in Moldova) he grew up in Tajikistan, before studying at Tel Aviv University under Joseph Bernstein (1990–1996). He received his doctorate in 1997 for a thesis entitled "Automorphic Sheaves and Eisenstein Series". He has been awarded a Harvard Junior Fellowship, a Clay Research Fellowship, the prize of the European Mathematical Society, and a Breakthrough Prize in Mathematics for his work.

His work in geometric Langlands resulted in a joint 2002 paper with Edward Frenkel and Kari Vilonen, establishing the conjecture for finite fields, and a separate 2004 paper, generalizing the proof to include the field of complex numbers as well. This was followed by a series of papers in 2024 that claim to prove the (categorical, unramified) geometric Langlands correspondence, by a team of led by Gaitsgory and Sam Raskin; for this, Gaitsgory was awarded the 2025 Breakthrough Prize in Mathematics.

Prior to his current appointment at MPIM Bonn, he was a professor of mathematics at Harvard and an associate professor at the University of Chicago from 2001–2005.

== Honors and awards ==
In 2025, he received the Breakthrough Prize in Mathematics.

== Personal life ==
Gaitsgory's father, Vladimir Gaitsgory, is an applied mathematician at Macquarie University.

== Selected publications ==
- Gaitsgory, Dennis; Rozenblyum, Nick (2017). A Study in Derived Algebraic Geometry. American Mathematical Society. ISBN 978-1-4704-3569-1.
- Gaitsgory, Dennis; Lurie, Jacob (19 February 2019). Weil's Conjecture for Function Fields: Volume I (AMS-199). Princeton University Press. ISBN 978-0-691-18443-2.
