= James Williamson (Australian cyclist) =

James Williamson (1983–2010) was an Australian journalist and cyclist who won the World Solo 24-hour mountain bike Championships in Canada in 2008. His brother, Geordie Williamson, is a renowned mathematician.

== Death ==
On 23 March 2010, James Williamson died whilst competing in the Absa Cape Epic, a 722 km eight-day race in South Africa. After competing in the first two stages and being in 18th place in the field of 1200, he died in his hotel room prior to the third stage. His death was due to an undiagnosed heart condition; an autopsy found that one of the chambers of his heart was not functioning correctly, which led to the enlargement of one of the ventricles in his heart.

Williamson was also an editor at Enduro magazine and blogged during each race on his personal website. His final post was written two days before his death.
