= Decomposition theorem of Beilinson, Bernstein and Deligne =

In mathematics, especially algebraic geometry, the decomposition theorem of Beilinson, Bernstein, Deligne and Gabber or BBDG decomposition theorem is a set of results concerning the cohomology of algebraic varieties. It was originally conjectured by Gelfand and MacPherson.

== Statement ==
=== Decomposition for smooth proper maps ===
The first case of the decomposition theorem arises via the hard Lefschetz theorem which gives isomorphisms, for a smooth proper map $f: X \to Y$ of relative dimension d between two projective varieties

$$- \cup \eta^i : R^{d-i}f_* (\mathbb Q) \stackrel \cong \to R^{d+i} f_*(\mathbb Q).$$

Here $\eta$ is the fundamental class of a hyperplane section, $f_*$ is the direct image (pushforward) and $R^n f_*$ is the n-th derived functor of the direct image. This derived functor measures the n-th cohomologies of $f^{-1}(U)$, for $U \subset Y$. In fact, the particular case when Y is a point, amounts to the isomorphism

$$- \cup \eta^i : H^{d-i} (X, \mathbb Q) \stackrel \cong \to H^{d+i} (X, \mathbb Q).$$

This hard Lefschetz isomorphism induces canonical isomorphisms

$$Rf_* (\mathbb Q) \stackrel \cong \to \bigoplus_{i=-d}^{d} R^{d+i} f_*(\mathbb Q)[-d-i].$$

Moreover, the sheaves $R^{d+i} f_* \mathbb Q$ appearing in this decomposition are local systems, i.e., locally free sheaves of Q-vector spaces, which are moreover semisimple, i.e., a direct sum of local systems without nontrivial local subsystems.

=== Decomposition for proper maps ===
The decomposition theorem generalizes this fact to the case of a proper, but not necessarily smooth map $f: X \to Y$ between varieties. In a nutshell, the results above remain true when the notion of local systems is replaced by perverse sheaves.

The hard Lefschetz theorem above takes the following form: there is an isomorphism in the derived category of sheaves on Y:

$${}^p H^{-i} (Rf_* \mathbb Q) \cong  {}^p H^{+i} (Rf_* \mathbb Q),$$

where $Rf_*$ is the total derived functor of $f_*$ and ${}^p H^i$ is the i-th truncation with respect to the perverse t-structure.

Moreover, there is an isomorphism

$$Rf_* IC_X^\bullet \cong \bigoplus_i {}^p H^i (Rf_* IC_X^\bullet)[-i].$$

where the summands are semi-simple perverse-sheaves, meaning they are direct sums of push-forwards of intersection cohomology sheaves.

If X is not smooth, then the above results remain true when $\mathbb Q[\dim X]$ is replaced by the intersection cohomology complex $IC$.

== Proofs ==
The decomposition theorem was first proved by Beilinson, Bernstein, Deligne and Gabber. Their proof is based on the usage of weights on l-adic sheaves in positive characteristic. A different proof using mixed Hodge modules was given by Saito. A more geometric proof, based on the notion of semismall maps was given by de Cataldo and Migliorini.

For semismall maps, the decomposition theorem also applies to Chow motives.

== Applications of the theorem ==
=== Cohomology of a Rational Lefschetz Pencil ===
Consider a rational morphism $f:X \rightarrow \mathbb{P}^1$ from a smooth quasi-projective variety given by $[f_1(x):f_2(x)]$. If we set the vanishing locus of $f_1,f_2$ as $Y$ then there is an induced morphism $\tilde{X} = Bl_Y(X) \to \mathbb{P}^1$. We can compute the cohomology of $X$ from the intersection cohomology of $Bl_Y(X)$ and subtracting off the cohomology from the blowup along $Y$. This can be done using the perverse spectral sequence

$$E_2^{l,m} = H^l(\mathbb{P}^1; {}^\mathfrak{p}\mathcal{H}^m(IC_{\tilde{X}}^\bullet(\mathbb{Q})) \Rightarrow IH^{l + m}(\tilde{X};\mathbb{Q}) \cong H^{l+m}(X;\mathbb{Q})$$

=== Local invariant cycle theorem ===
Let $f : X \to Y$ be a proper morphism between complex algebraic varieties such that $X$ is smooth. Also, let $y_0$ be a regular value of $f$ that is in an open ball B centered at $y$. Then the restriction map

$$\operatorname{H}^*(f^{-1}(y), \mathbb{Q}) = \operatorname{H}^*(f^{-1}(B), \mathbb{Q}) \to \operatorname{H}^*(f^{-1}(y_0), \mathbb{Q})^{\pi_{1, \textrm{loc}}}$$

is surjective, where $\pi_{1, \textrm{loc}}$ is the fundamental group of the intersection of $B$ with the set of regular values of f.
