= Intersection homology =

In topology, a branch of mathematics, intersection homology is an analogue of singular homology especially well-suited for the study of singular spaces, discovered by Mark Goresky and Robert MacPherson in the fall of 1974 and developed by them over the next few years.

Intersection cohomology was used to prove the Kazhdan–Lusztig conjectures and the Riemann–Hilbert correspondence. It is closely related to L^{2} cohomology.

== Goresky–MacPherson approach ==
The homology groups of a compact, oriented, connected, n-dimensional manifold X have a fundamental property called Poincaré duality: there is a perfect pairing

$$H_i(X,\Q) \times H_{n-i}(X,\Q) \to H_0(X,\Q) \cong \Q.$$

Classically—going back, for instance, to Henri Poincaré—this duality was understood in terms of intersection theory. An element of

$$H_j(X)$$

is represented by a j-dimensional cycle. If an i-dimensional and an $(n-i)$-dimensional cycle are in general position, then their intersection is a finite collection of points. Using the orientation of X one may assign to each of these points a sign; in other words intersection yields a 0-dimensional cycle. One may prove that the homology class of this cycle depends only on the homology classes of the original i- and $(n-i)$-dimensional cycles; one may furthermore prove that this pairing is perfect.

When X has singularities—that is, when the space has places that do not look like $\R^n$—these ideas break down. For example, it is no longer possible to make sense of the notion of "general position" for cycles. Goresky and MacPherson introduced a class of "allowable" cycles for which general position does make sense. They introduced an equivalence relation for allowable cycles (where only "allowable boundaries" are equivalent to zero), and called the group

$$IH_i(X)$$

of i-dimensional allowable cycles modulo this equivalence relation "intersection homology". They furthermore showed that the intersection of an i- and an $(n-i)$-dimensional allowable cycle gives an (ordinary) zero-cycle whose homology class is well-defined.

=== Stratifications ===
Intersection homology was originally defined on suitable spaces with a stratification, though the groups often turn out to be independent of the choice of stratification. There are many different definitions of stratified spaces. A convenient one for intersection homology is an n-dimensional topological pseudomanifold. This is a (paracompact, Hausdorff) space X that has a filtration

$$\emptyset = X_{-1} \subset X_0 \subset X_1 \subset \cdots \subset X_n = X$$

of X by closed subspaces such that:

- For each i and for each point x of $X_i \setminus X_{i-1}$, there exists a neighborhood $U \subset X$ of x in X, a compact $(n-i-1)$-dimensional stratified space L, and a filtration-preserving homeomorphism $U \cong \R^i \times CL$. Here $CL$ is the open cone on L.
- $X_{n-1} = X_{n-2}$.
- $X\setminus X_{n-1}$ is dense in X.

If X is a topological pseudomanifold, the i-dimensional stratum of X is the space $X_i \setminus X_{i-1}$.

Examples:

- If X is an n-dimensional simplicial complex such that every simplex is contained in an n-simplex and n−1 simplex is contained in exactly two n-simplexes, then the underlying space of X is a topological pseudomanifold.
- If X is any complex quasi-projective variety (possibly with singularities) then its underlying space is a topological pseudomanifold, with all strata of even dimension.

=== Perversities ===
Intersection homology groups $I^\mathbf{p}H_i(X)$ depend on a choice of perversity $\mathbf{p}$, which measures how far cycles are allowed to deviate from transversality. (The origin of the name "perversity" was explained by Goresky (2010).) A perversity $\mathbf{p}$ is a function

$$\mathbf{p}\colon\Z_{\geq 2} \to \Z$$

from integers $\geq 2$ to the integers such that

- $\mathbf{p}(2) = 0$.
- $\mathbf{p}(k+1) - \mathbf{p}(k) \in \{0,1\}$.

The second condition is used to show invariance of intersection homology groups under change of stratification.

The complementary perversity $\mathbf{q}$ of $\mathbf{p}$ is the one with

$$\mathbf{p}(k)+\mathbf{q}(k)=k-2$$.

Intersection homology groups of complementary dimension and complementary perversity are dually paired.

==== Examples of perversities ====
- The minimal perversity has $p(k) = 0$. Its complement is the maximal perversity with $q(k)=k-2$.
- The (lower) middle perversity m is defined by $m(k)=[(k-2)/2]$, the integer part of $(k-2)/2$. Its complement is the upper middle perversity, with values $[(k-1)/2]$. If the perversity is not specified, then one usually means the lower middle perversity. If a space can be stratified with all strata of even dimension (for example, any complex variety) then the intersection homology groups are independent of the values of the perversity on odd integers, so the upper and lower middle perversities are equivalent.

=== Singular intersection homology ===
Fix a topological pseudomanifold X of dimension n with some stratification, and a perversity p.

A map σ from the standard i-simplex $\Delta^i$ to X (a singular simplex) is called allowable if

$$\sigma^{-1} \left (X_{n-k}\setminus X_{n-k-1} \right)$$

is contained in the $i-k+p(k)$ skeleton of $\Delta^i$.

The chain complex $I^p(X)$ is a subcomplex of the complex of singular chains on X that consists of all singular chains such that both the chain and its boundary are linear combinations of allowable singular simplexes. The singular intersection homology groups (with perversity p)

$$I^pH_i(X)$$

are the homology groups of this complex.

If X has a triangulation compatible with the stratification, then simplicial intersection homology groups can be defined in a similar way, and are naturally isomorphic to the singular intersection homology groups.

The intersection homology groups are independent of the choice of stratification of X.

If X is a topological manifold, then the intersection homology groups (for any perversity) are the same as the usual homology groups.

== Small resolutions ==
A resolution of singularities

$$f:X\to Y$$

of a complex variety Y is called a small resolution if for every r > 0, the space of points of Y where the fiber has dimension r is of codimension greater than 2r. Roughly speaking, this means that most fibers are small. In this case the morphism induces an isomorphism from the (intersection) homology of X to the intersection homology of Y (with the middle perversity).

There is a variety with two different small resolutions that have different ring structures on their cohomology, showing that there is in general no natural ring structure on intersection (co)homology.

== Sheaf theory ==
Deligne's formula for intersection cohomology states that

$$I^pH_{n-i}(X) = I^pH^i(X) = H^{i}_c(IC_p(X))$$

where $IC_p(X)$ is the intersection complex, a certain complex of constructible sheaves on X (considered as an element of the derived category, so the cohomology on the right means the hypercohomology of the complex). The complex $IC_p(X)$ is given by starting with the constant sheaf on the open set $X\setminus X_{n-2}$ and repeatedly extending it to larger open sets $X\setminus X_{n-k}$ and then truncating it in the derived category; more precisely it is given by Deligne's formula

$$IC_p(X) = \tau_{\le p(n)-n}\mathbf{R}i_{n*}\tau_{\le p(n-1)-n}\mathbf{R}i_{n-1*}\cdots\tau_{\le p(2)-n}\mathbf{R}i_{2*} \Complex_{X\setminus X_{n-2}}$$

where $\tau_{\le p}$ is a truncation functor in the derived category, $i_k$ is the inclusion of $X\setminus X_{n-k}$ into $X\setminus X_{n-k-1}$, and $\Complex_{X\setminus X_{n-2}}$ is the constant sheaf on $X\setminus X_{n-2}$.

By replacing the constant sheaf on $X\setminus X_{n-2}$ with a local system, one can use Deligne's formula to define intersection cohomology with coefficients in a local system.

=== Examples ===
Given a smooth elliptic curve $X \subset \mathbb{CP}^2$ defined by a cubic homogeneous polynomial $f$, such as $x^3 + y^3 + z^3$, the affine cone $\mathbb{V}(f) \subset \mathbb{C}^3$ has an isolated singularity at the origin since $f(0) = 0$ and all partial derivatives $\partial_if(0) = 0$ vanish. This is because it is homogeneous of degree $3$, and the derivatives are homogeneous of degree 2. Setting $U = \mathbb{V}(f) -\{0\}$ and $i:U \hookrightarrow X$ the inclusion map, the intersection complex $IC_{\mathbb{V}(f)}$ is given as
$$\tau_{\leq 1} \mathbf{R}i_*\mathbb{Q}_U$$
This can be computed explicitly by looking at the stalks of the cohomology. At $p \in \mathbb{V}(f)$ where $p \neq 0$ the derived pushforward is the identity map on a smooth point, hence the only possible cohomology is concentrated in degree $0$. For $p = 0$ the cohomology is more interesting since
$$\mathbf{R}^ki_*\mathbb{Q}_U|_{p=0} = \mathop{\underset{V \subset U}\text{colim}} H^k(V; \mathbb{Q})$$
for $V$ where the closure of $i(V)$ contains the origin $p=0$. Since any such $V$ can be refined by considering the intersection of an open disk in $\mathbb{C}^3$ with $U$, we can just compute the cohomology $H^k(U;\mathbb{Q})$. This can be done by observing $U$ is a $\mathbb{C}^*$ bundle over the elliptic curve $X$, the hyperplane bundle, and the Wang sequence gives the cohomology groups
$$\begin{align}
H^0(U;\mathbb{Q})&\cong H^0(X;\mathbb{Q})=\mathbb{Q} \\
H^1(U;\mathbb{Q})&\cong H^1(X;\mathbb{Q})=\mathbb{Q}^{\oplus 2}\\
H^2(U;\mathbb{Q})&\cong H^1(X;\mathbb{Q})=\mathbb{Q}^{\oplus 2} \\
H^3(U;\mathbb{Q})&\cong H^2(X;\mathbb{Q})=\mathbb{Q} \\
\end{align}$$
hence the cohomology sheaves at the stalk $p=0$ are
$$\begin{matrix}
\mathcal{H}^2\left(\mathbf{R}i_*\mathbb{Q}_U|_{p=0}\right) & = & \mathbb{Q}_{p=0} \\
\mathcal{H}^1\left(\mathbf{R}i_*\mathbb{Q}_U|_{p=0}\right) & = & \mathbb{Q}_{p=0}^{\oplus 2} \\
\mathcal{H}^0\left(\mathbf{R}i_*\mathbb{Q}_U|_{p=0}\right) & = & \mathbb{Q}_{p=0}
\end{matrix}$$
Truncating this gives the nontrivial cohomology sheaves $\mathcal{H}^0,\mathcal{H}^1$, hence the intersection complex $IC_{\mathbb{V}(f)}$ has cohomology sheaves
$$\begin{matrix}
\mathcal{H}^0(IC_{\mathbb{V}(f)}) & = & \mathbb{Q}_{\mathbb{V}(f)} \\
\mathcal{H}^1(IC_{\mathbb{V}(f)}) & = & \mathbb{Q}_{p=0}^{\oplus 2} \\
\mathcal{H}^i(IC_{\mathbb{V}(f)}) & = & 0 & \text{for }i\ne 0,1
\end{matrix}$$

== Properties of the complex IC(X) ==
The complex IC_{p}(X) has the following properties

- On the complement of some closed set of codimension 2, we have

$H^i(j_x^* IC_p)$ is 0 for i + m ≠ 0, and for i = −m the groups form the constant local system C

- $H^i(j_x^* IC_p)$ is 0 for i + m < 0
- If i > 0 then $H^{-i}(j_x^* IC_p)$ is zero except on a set of codimension at least a for the smallest a with p(a) ≥ m − i
- If i > 0 then $H^{-i}(j_x^! IC_p)$ is zero except on a set of codimension at least a for the smallest a with q(a) ≥ (i)

As usual, q is the complementary perversity to p. Moreover, the complex is uniquely characterized by these conditions, up to isomorphism in the derived category. The conditions do not depend on the choice of stratification, so this shows that intersection cohomology does not depend on the choice of stratification either.

Verdier duality takes IC_{p} to IC_{q} shifted by n = dim(X) in the derived category.

== See also ==
- Decomposition theorem
- Borel–Moore homology
- Topologically stratified space
- Intersection theory
- Perverse sheaf
- Mixed Hodge structure
