= Satake isomorphism =

Mathematics concept

In mathematics, the Satake isomorphism, introduced by Ichirō Satake (1963), identifies the Hecke algebra of a reductive group over a local field with a ring of invariants of the Weyl group. The geometric Satake equivalence is a geometric version of the Satake isomorphism, proved by Ivan Mirković and Kari Vilonen (2007).

== Statement ==
Classical Satake isomorphism. Let $G$ be a semisimple algebraic group, $K$ be a non-Archimedean local field and $O$ be its ring of integers. It's easy to see that $Gr = G(K)/G(O)$ is a Grassmannian. For simplicity, we can think that $K = \Z/p\Z((x))$ and $O = \Z/p\Z[[x]]$, for $p$ a prime number; in this case, $Gr$ is an infinite dimensional algebraic variety (Ginzburg 2000). One denotes the category of all compactly supported spherical functions on $G(K)$ bi-invariant under the action of $G(O)$ as $\Complex_c[G(O) \backslash G(K)/G(O)]$, $\Complex$ the field of complex numbers, which is a Hecke algebra and can be also treated as a group scheme over $\Complex$. Let $T(\Complex)$ be the maximal torus of $G(\Complex)$, $W$ be the Weyl group of $G$. One can associate a cocharacter variety $\mathbb{X}_*(T(\Complex))$ to $T(\Complex)$. Let $X_*(T(\Complex))$ be the set of all cocharacters of $T(\Complex)$, i.e. $X_*(T(\Complex)) = \mathrm{Hom}(\Complex^*, T(\Complex))$. The cocharacter variety $\mathbb{X}_*(T(\Complex))$ is basically the group scheme created by adding the elements of $X_*(T(\Complex))$ as variables to $\Complex$, i.e. $\mathbb{X}_*(T(\Complex)) = \Complex[X_*(T(\Complex))]$. There is a natural action of $W$ on the cocharacter variety $\mathbb{X}_*(T(\Complex))$, induced by the natural action of $W$ on $T$. Then the Satake isomorphism is an algebra isomorphism from the category of spherical functions to the $W$-invariant part of the aforementioned cocharacter variety. In formulas:

$\Complex_c [G(O) \backslash G(K)/G(O)] \quad \xrightarrow{\sim} \quad \mathbb{X}_*(T(\Complex))^W$.

Geometric Satake isomorphism. As Ginzburg said (Ginzburg 2000), "geometric" stands for sheaf theoretic. In order to obtain the geometric version of Satake isomorphism, one has to change the left part of the isomorphism, using the Grothendieck group of the category of perverse sheaves on $Gr$ to replace the category of spherical functions; the replacement is de facto an algebra isomorphism over $\Complex$ (Ginzburg 2000). One has also to replace the right hand side of the isomorphism by the Grothendieck group of finite dimensional complex representations of the Langlands dual ${}^L G$ of $G$; the replacement is also an algebra isomorphism over $\Complex$ (Ginzburg 2000). Let $\mathrm{Perv}(Gr)$ denote the category of perverse sheaves on $Gr$. Then, the geometric Satake isomorphism is

$K(\mathrm{Perv}(Gr)) \otimes_\Z \Complex \quad \xrightarrow{\sim} \quad K(\mathrm{Rep}({}^LG)) \otimes_\Z \Complex$,

where the $K$ in $K(\mathrm{Rep}({}^LG))$ stands for the Grothendieck group. This can be obviously simplified to

$\mathrm{Perv}(Gr) \quad \xrightarrow{\sim} \quad \mathrm{Rep}({}^LG)$,

which is a fortiori an equivalence of Tannakian categories (Ginzburg 2000).
