= Max Planck Institute for Mathematics =

Mathematical institute

Coordinates: 50°44′4″N 7°5′54″E

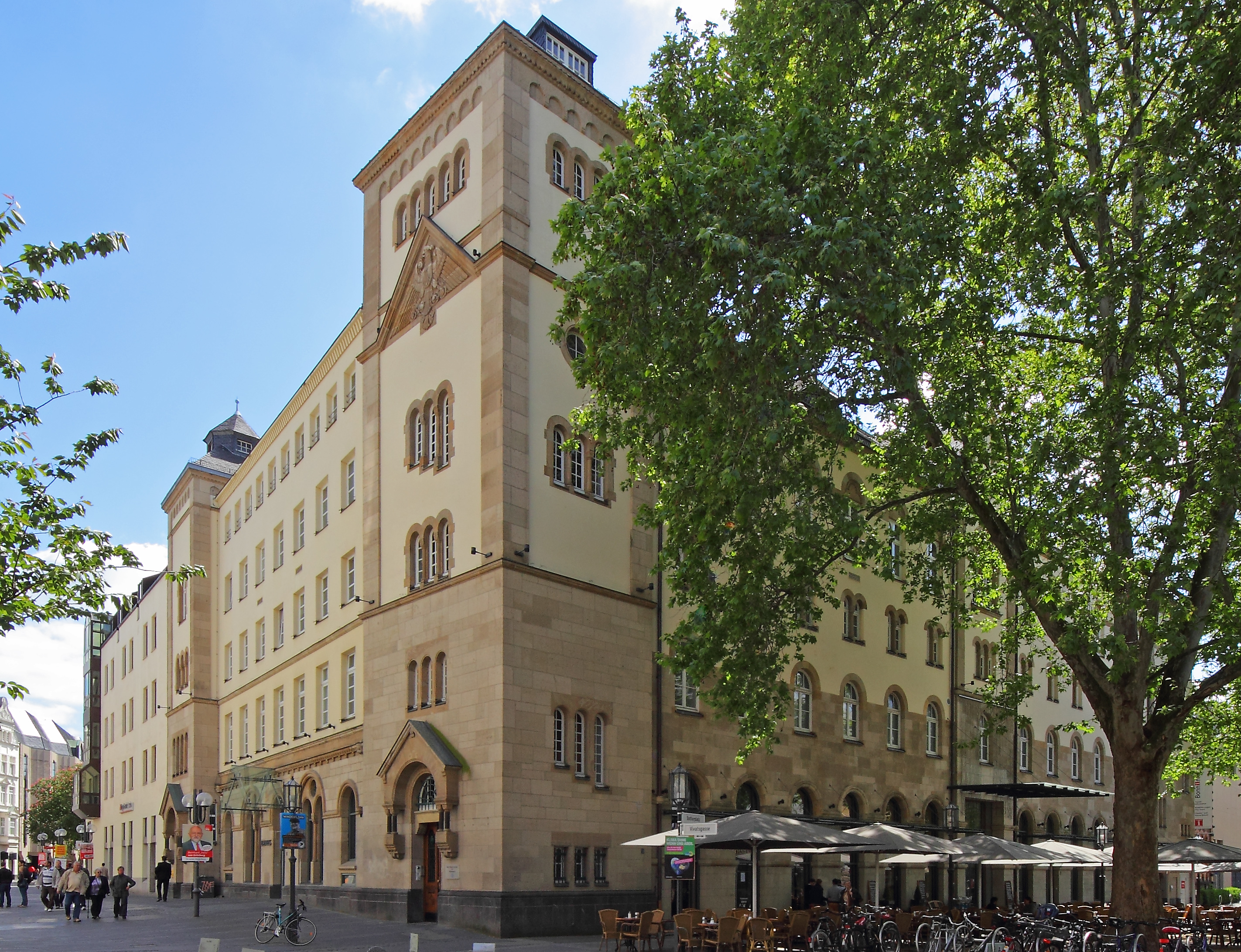
- Abbreviation: MPIM
- Formation: 1980; 46 years ago
- Type: Scientific institute
- Purpose: Research in mathematics
- Headquarters: Bonn, North Rhine-Westphalia, Germany
- Key people: Friedrich Hirzebruch, founder. Gerd Faltings, Peter Scholze fields medalists.
- Parent organization: Max Planck Society
- Website: www.mpim-bonn.mpg.de (in English)

The Max Planck Institute for Mathematics (German: Max-Planck-Institut für Mathematik, MPIM) is a research institute located in Bonn, Germany. It is named in honor of the German physicist Max Planck and forms part of the Max Planck Society (Max-Planck-Gesellschaft), an association of 84 institutes engaging in fundamental research in the arts and the sciences. The MPIM is the only Max Planck institute specializing in pure mathematics.

The Institute was founded by Friedrich Hirzebruch in 1980, having emerged from the collaborative research center "Theoretical Mathematics" (Sonderforschungsbereich "Theoretische Mathematik"). Hirzebruch shaped the institute as its director until his retirement in 1995. Currently, the institute is managed by a board of three directors consisting of Peter Teichner (managing director), Peter Scholze and Dennis Gaitsgory. Friedrich Hirzebruch and Yuri Manin were, and Günter Harder, Werner Ballmann, Gerd Faltings and Don Zagier are, acting as emeriti.

== Research ==
The Max Planck Institute for Mathematics offers mathematicians from around the world the opportunity to visit Bonn and engage in sabbatical work lasting from weeks to several months. This guest program distinguishes the MPIM from other Max Planck institutes, and results in only a limit number of permanent positions and the absence of separate departments within the institute.

The research of the members and guests of the institute can be classified into the following areas:

- Algebraic geometry and complex geometry
- Algebraic group
- Algebraic topology
- Arithmetic geometry
- Differential geometry and differential topology
- Dynamical system
- Global analysis
- Mathematical physics
- Noncommutative geometry
- Number theory
- Representation theory
