= Springer resolution =

In mathematics, the Springer resolution is a resolution of the variety of nilpotent elements in a semisimple Lie algebra, or the unipotent elements of a reductive algebraic group, introduced by Tonny Albert Springer in 1969. The fibers of this resolution are called Springer fibers.

If U is the variety of unipotent elements in a reductive group G, and X the variety of Borel subgroups B, then the Springer resolution of U is the variety of pairs (u,B) of U×X such that u is in the Borel subgroup B. The map to U is the projection to the first factor. The Springer resolution for Lie algebras is similar, except that U is replaced by the nilpotent elements of the Lie algebra of G and X replaced by the variety of Borel subalgebras.

The Grothendieck–Springer resolution is defined similarly, except that U is replaced by the whole group G (or the whole Lie algebra of G). When restricted to the unipotent elements of G it becomes the Springer resolution.

== Examples ==
When G=SL(2), the Lie algebra Springer resolution is T^{*}P^{1} → n, where n are the nilpotent elements of sl(2). In this example, n are the matrices x with tr(x^{2})=0, which is a two dimensional conical subvariety of sl(2). n has a unique singular point 0, the fibre above which in the Springer resolution is the zero section P^{1} .
