= Geometric Langlands correspondence =

Mathematical theory

In mathematics, the geometric Langlands correspondence relates algebraic geometry and representation theory. It is a reformulation of the Langlands correspondence obtained by replacing the number fields appearing in the original number theoretic version by function fields and applying techniques from algebraic geometry. The correspondence is named for the Canadian mathematician Robert Langlands, who formulated the original form of it in the late 1960s.

The geometric Langlands conjecture asserts the existence of the geometric Langlands correspondence.

== Background ==
In mathematics, the classical Langlands correspondence is a collection of results and conjectures relating number theory and representation theory. Formulated by Robert Langlands in the late 1960s, the Langlands correspondence is related to important conjectures in number theory such as the Taniyama–Shimura conjecture, which includes Fermat's Last Theorem as a special case.

Langlands correspondences can be formulated for global fields (as well as local fields), which are classified into number fields or global function fields. Establishing the classical Langlands correspondence, for number fields, has proven extremely difficult. As a result, some mathematicians posed the geometric Langlands correspondence for global function fields, which in some sense have proven easier to deal with.

The geometric Langlands conjecture for general linear groups $GL(n,K)$ over a function field $K$ was formulated by Vladimir Drinfeld and Gérard Laumon in 1987.

== Status ==
The geometric Langlands conjecture was proved for $GL(1)$ by Pierre Deligne and for $GL(2)$ by Drinfeld in 1983.

A claimed proof of the categorical unramified geometric Langlands conjecture was announced on May 6, 2024 by a team of nine mathematicians including Dennis Gaitsgory and Sam Raskin. The claimed proof is contained in more than 1,000 pages across five papers and has been called "so complex that almost no one can explain it". Even conveying the significance of the result to other mathematicians was described as "very hard, almost impossible" by Drinfeld. For this work, in 2025 Gaitsgory was awarded the Breakthrough Prize in Mathematics and Raskin was awarded the New Horizons in Mathematics Prize.

== Connection to physics ==
In a paper from 2007, Anton Kapustin and Edward Witten described a connection between the geometric Langlands correspondence and S-duality, a property of certain quantum field theories.

In 2018, when accepting the Abel Prize, Langlands delivered a paper reformulating the geometric program using tools similar to his original Langlands correspondence. Langlands' ideas were further developed by Etingof, Frenkel, and Kazhdan.
