= Riemann–Hilbert correspondence =

Concept in mathematics

The Riemann–Hilbert correspondence is a correspondence between abstract algebra (specifically group theory) and mathematical analysis (specifically differential equations). Classically, David Hilbert posed his twenty-first problem, referencing earlier work by Bernhard Riemann. The basic idea of this problem can be illustrated with an example: the complex differential equation $zf'(z)=1$ has solutions $f(z) = \log z + C$, which is regular everywhere except at 0 and $\infty$ on the Riemann sphere. If we continue the function, following a loop around the origin, the value of the function changes by an integer multiple of $2\pi i$. This phenomenon is called monodromy of the differential equation $zf'(z)=1$. The monodromy for this example thus corresponds to adding an integer multiple of $2\pi i$, which is a representation of the fundamental group of the sphere punctured in two points. Hilbert's 21st problem asks whether every suitable monodromy representation arises from a linear differential equation with regular singularites.

Modern research on the Riemann–Hilbert correspondence generalizes this, from ordinary differential equations (on the Riemann sphere) to systems of partial differential equations on higher-dimensional complex manifolds, or higher-genus Riemann surfaces. The problem is usually formulated as a correspondence between flat connections on algebraic vector bundles and representations of the fundamental group. The correspondence is between certain systems of partial differential equations (linear and having very special properties for their solutions) and possible monodromies of their solutions, and there are many generalizations and variants.

Such a result was proved for algebraic connections with regular singularities by Pierre Deligne (1970, generalizing existing work in the case of Riemann surfaces) and more generally for regular holonomic D-modules by Masaki Kashiwara (1980, 1984) and Zoghman Mebkhout (1980, 1984) independently. In the setting of nonabelian Hodge theory, the Riemann-Hilbert correspondence provides a complex analytic isomorphism between two of the three natural algebraic structures on the moduli spaces, and so is naturally viewed as a nonabelian analogue of the comparison isomorphism between De Rham cohomology and singular/Betti cohomology.

== Statement ==
Suppose that X is a smooth complex algebraic variety.

Riemann–Hilbert correspondence (for regular singular connections): there is a functor Sol called the local solutions functor, that is an equivalence from the category of flat connections on algebraic vector bundles on X with regular singularities to the category of local systems of finite-dimensional complex vector spaces on X. For X connected, the category of local systems is also equivalent to the category of complex representations of the fundamental group of X. Thus such connections give a purely algebraic way to access the finite dimensional representations of the topological fundamental group.

The condition of regular singularities means that locally constant sections of the bundle (with respect to the flat connection) have moderate growth at points of Y − X, where Y is an algebraic compactification of X. In particular, when X is compact, the condition of regular singularities is vacuous.

More generally there is the

Riemann–Hilbert correspondence (for regular holonomic D-modules): there is a functor DR called the de Rham functor, that is an equivalence from the category of holonomic D-modules on X with regular singularities to the category of perverse sheaves on X.

By considering the irreducible elements of each category, this gives a 1:1 correspondence between isomorphism classes of

- irreducible holonomic D-modules on X with regular singularities,

and

- intersection cohomology complexes of irreducible closed subvarieties of X with coefficients in irreducible local systems.

A D-module is something like a system of differential equations on X, and a local system on a subvariety is something like a description of possible monodromies, so this correspondence can be thought of as describing certain systems of differential equations in terms of the monodromies of their solutions.

In the case X has dimension one (a complex algebraic curve) then there is a more general Riemann–Hilbert correspondence for algebraic connections with no regularity assumption (or for holonomic D-modules with no regularity assumption) described in Malgrange (1991), the Riemann–Hilbert–Birkhoff correspondence.

== Examples ==
An example where the theorem applies is the differential equation

$$\frac{df}{dz} = \frac{a}{z}f$$

on the punctured affine line A^{1} − {0} (that is, on the nonzero complex numbers C − {0}). Here a is a fixed complex number. This equation has regular singularities at 0 and ∞ in the projective line P^{1}. The local solutions of the equation are of the form cz^{a} for constants c. If a is not an integer, then the function z^{a} cannot be made well-defined on all of C − {0}. That means that the equation has nontrivial monodromy. Explicitly, the monodromy of this equation is the 1-dimensional representation of the fundamental group π_{1}(A^{1} − {0}) = Z in which the generator (a loop around the origin) acts by multiplication by e^{2πia}.

To see the need for the hypothesis of regular singularities, consider the differential equation

$$\frac{df}{dz} = f$$

on the affine line A^{1} (that is, on the complex numbers C). This equation corresponds to a flat connection on the trivial algebraic line bundle over A^{1}. The solutions of the equation are of the form ce^{z} for constants c. Since these solutions do not have polynomial growth on some sectors around the point ∞ in the projective line P^{1}, the equation does not have regular singularities at ∞. (This can also be seen by rewriting the equation in terms of the variable w := 1/z, where it becomes

$$\frac{df}{dw} = -\frac{1}{w^2}f.$$

The pole of order 2 in the coefficients means that the equation does not have regular singularities at w = 0, according to Fuchs's theorem.)

Since the functions ce^{z} are defined on the whole affine line A^{1}, the monodromy of this flat connection is trivial. But this flat connection is not isomorphic to the obvious flat connection on the trivial line bundle over A^{1} (as an algebraic vector bundle with flat connection), because its solutions do not have moderate growth at ∞. This shows the need to restrict to flat connections with regular singularities in the Riemann–Hilbert correspondence. On the other hand, if we work with holomorphic (rather than algebraic) vector bundles with flat connection on a noncompact complex manifold such as A^{1} = C, then the notion of regular singularities is not defined. A much more elementary theorem than the Riemann–Hilbert correspondence states that flat connections on holomorphic vector bundles are determined up to isomorphism by their monodromy.

== In characteristic p ==
For schemes in characteristic p>0, Emerton & Kisin (2004) (later developed further under less restrictive assumptions in Bhatt & Lurie (2019)) establish a Riemann-Hilbert correspondence that asserts in particular that étale cohomology of étale sheaves with Z/p-coefficients can be computed in terms of the action of the Frobenius endomorphism on coherent cohomology.

More generally, there are equivalences of categories between constructible (resp. perverse) étale Z/p-sheaves and left (resp. right) modules with a Frobenius (resp. Cartier) action. This can be regarded as the positive characteristic analogue of the classical theory, where one can find a similar interplay of constructive vs. perverse t-structures.

== See also ==
- Riemann–Hilbert problem
