= Joseph Bernstein =

Israeli mathematician

- יוסף ברנשטיין
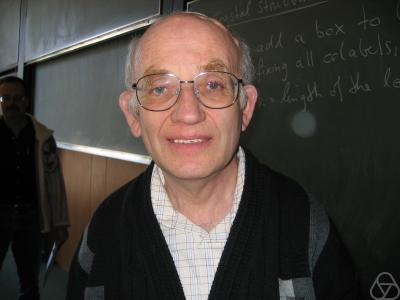
- Joseph Bernstein (picture from MFO)
- Born: 18 April 1945 (age 81); Moscow, Russian SFSR, Soviet Union
- Education: Moscow State University
- Known for: Bernstein–Sato polynomial D-modules; Bernstein–Gelfand–Gelfand resolution proof of Kazhdan–Lusztig conjectures perverse sheaves
- Awards: Israel Prize (2004); Wolf Prize in Mathematics (2026)
- Scientific career
- Fields: Mathematics
- Workplaces: Tel Aviv University; Harvard University
- Doctoral advisor: Israil Gelfand
- Doctoral students: Roman Bezrukavnikov; Alexander Braverman; Edward Frenkel; Dennis Gaitsgory; Ronny Hadani; Andrei Zelevinsky

Joseph Bernstein (sometimes spelled I. N. Bernshtein; Hebrew: יוס(י)ף נאומוביץ ברנשטיין; Russian: Иосиф Наумович Бернштейн; born 18 April 1945) is a Soviet-born Israeli mathematician working at Tel Aviv University. He works in algebraic geometry, representation theory, and number theory.

== Biography ==
Bernstein received his Ph.D. in 1972 under Israel Gelfand at Moscow State University. In 1981, he emigrated to the United States due to growing antisemitism in the Soviet Union. Bernstein was a professor at Harvard during 1983-1993. He was a visiting scholar at the Institute for Advanced Study in 1985-86 and again in 1997-98. In 1993, he moved to Israel to take a professorship at Tel Aviv University (emeritus since 2014).

== Awards and honors ==
Bernstein received a gold medal at the 1962 International Mathematical Olympiad. He was elected to the Israel Academy of Sciences and Humanities in 2002 and was elected to the United States National Academy of Sciences in 2004. In 2004, Bernstein was awarded the Israel Prize for mathematics. In 1998, he was an Invited Speaker of the International Congress of Mathematicians in Berlin. In 2012, he became a fellow of the American Mathematical Society. In 2026 he was awarded the Wolf Prize in Mathematics.

== Publications ==
- Publication list
- Some pdf files of papers by Bernstein including Algebraic theory of D-modules and his notes on Meromorphic continuation of Eisenstein series
- Beilinson, A.A.; Bernstein, J.; Deligne, P. (2018) [1982], "Faisceaux pervers", Astérisque, vol. 100, Société Mathématique de France, Paris, ISBN 978-2-85629-878-7, MR 0751966

== See also ==
- Bernstein–Sato polynomial
- Bernstein–Gelfand–Gelfand resolution
