= Conifold =

Generalization of a manifold

In mathematics and string theory, a conifold is a generalization of a manifold. Unlike manifolds, conifolds can contain conical singularities, i.e. points whose neighbourhoods look like cones over a certain base. In physics, in particular in flux compactifications of string theory, the base is usually a five-dimensional real manifold, since the typically considered conifolds are complex 3-dimensional (real 6-dimensional) spaces.

== Overview ==
Conifolds are important objects in string theory: Brian Greene explains the physics of conifolds in Chapter 13 of his book The Elegant Universe—including the fact that the space can tear near the cone, and its topology can change. This possibility was first noticed by Candelas et al. (1988) and employed by Green & Hübsch (1988) to prove that conifolds provide a connection between all (then) known Calabi–Yau compactifications in string theory; this partially supports a conjecture by Reid (1987) whereby conifolds connect all possible Calabi–Yau complex 3-dimensional spaces.

A well-known example of a conifold is obtained as a deformation limit of a quintic - i.e. a quintic hypersurface in the projective space $\mathbb{CP}^4$. The space $\mathbb{CP}^4$ has complex dimension equal to four, and therefore the space defined by the quintic (degree five) equations:

$$z_1^5+z_2^5+z_3^5+z_4^5+z_5^5-5\psi z_1z_2z_3z_4z_5 = 0$$

in terms of homogeneous coordinates $z_i$ on $\mathbb{CP}^4$, for any fixed complex $\psi$, has complex dimension three. This family of quintic hypersurfaces is the most famous example of Calabi–Yau manifolds. If the complex structure parameter $\psi$ is chosen to become equal to one, the manifold described above becomes singular since the derivatives of the quintic polynomial in the equation vanish when all coordinates $z_i$ are equal or their ratios are certain fifth roots of unity. The neighbourhood of this singular point looks like a cone whose base is topologically just $S^2 \times S^3$.

In the context of string theory, the geometrically singular conifolds can be shown to lead to completely smooth physics of strings. The divergences are "smeared out" by D3-branes wrapped on the shrinking three-sphere in Type IIB string theory and by D2-branes wrapped on the shrinking two-sphere in Type IIA string theory, as originally pointed out by Strominger (1995). As shown by Greene, Morrison & Strominger (1995), this provides the string-theoretic description of the topology-change via the conifold transition originally described by Candelas, Green & Hübsch (1990), who also invented the term "conifold" and the diagram

for the purpose. The two topologically distinct ways of smoothing a conifold are thus shown to involve replacing the singular vertex (node) by either a 3-sphere (by way of deforming the complex structure) or a 2-sphere (by way of a "small resolution"). It is believed that nearly all Calabi–Yau manifolds can be connected via these "critical transitions", resonating with Reid's conjecture.

== See also ==
- Orbifold (a distinct singular generalization of a manifold)
- Flop (relates the two small resolutions of a conifold point)
- Resolution of singularities
