= Ichirō Satake =

Japanese mathematician

Ichiro Satake
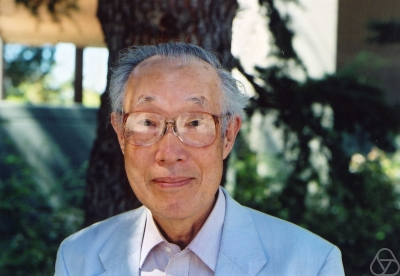
- Ichirō Satake in Berkeley, California
- Born: December 25, 1927; Tokyo, Japan
- Died: October 10, 2014 (aged 86)
- Education: University of Tokyo
- Known for: Satake isomorphism Satake diagrams
- Scientific career
- Fields: Mathematics
- Workplaces: University of Tokyo (1952-1963); University of Chicago (1963-1968); UC Berkeley (1968-1983); Tohoku University (1980-1991); Chuo University (1991-1998)
- Doctoral advisor: Shokichi Iyanaga

Ichirō Satake (佐武 一郎, Satake Ichirō) (25 December 1927 – 10 October 2014) was a Japanese mathematician working on algebraic groups who introduced the Satake isomorphism and Satake diagrams. He was considered an iconic figure in the theory of linear algebraic groups and symmetric spaces.

Satake was born in Tokyo, Japan in 1927, and received his Ph.D. at the University of Tokyo in 1959 under the supervision of Shokichi Iyanaga. He was a professor at University of California, Berkeley from 1968 to 1983. After retirement he returned to Japan, where he spent time at Tohoku University and Chuo University. He died of respiratory failure on 10 October 2014.

Although they are often attributed to William Thurston, Satake was the first to introduce orbifold, which he did in the 1950s under the name of V-manifold. In Satake (1956), he gave the modern definition, along with the basic calculus of smooth functions and differential forms. He demonstrated that the de Rham theorem and Poincaré duality, along with their proofs, carry over to the orbifold setting. In Satake (1957), he demonstrated that the standard tensor calculus of bundles, connections, and curvature also carries over to orbifolds, along with the Chern-Gauss-Bonnet theorem and Shiing-Shen Chern's proof thereof.

== Major publications ==
- Satake, I. (1956), "On a generalization of the notion of manifold", Proc. Natl. Acad. Sci. U.S.A., 42 (6): 359–363, Bibcode:1956PNAS...42..359S, doi:10.1073/pnas.42.6.359, PMC 528292, PMID 16578464
- Satake, Ichirô (1957), "The Gauss-Bonnet theorem for V-manifolds", J. Math. Soc. Jpn., 9 (4): 464–492, doi:10.2969/jmsj/00940464
- Satake, Ichirô (1963), "Theory of spherical functions on reductive algebraic groups over p-adic fields", Publications Mathématiques de l'IHÉS, 18 (18): 5–69, doi:10.1007/BF02684781, MR 0195863, S2CID 4666554
- Satake, Ichirô (1980), Algebraic structures of symmetric domains, Kanô Memorial Lectures, vol. 4, Tokyo: Iwanami Shoten, ISBN 978-0-691-08271-4, MR 0591460
