= David Nadler (mathematician) =

American mathematician (born 1973)

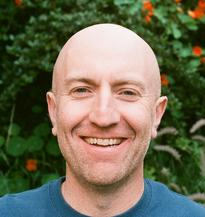
- David Nadler at Berkeley (2018)
- Born: 1973 (age 52–53)
- Education: Brown University; Princeton
- Awards: Fellow, American Mathematical Society (2013); Arf Lecture (2012); Sloan Fellowship (2007)
- Scientific career
- Fields: Mathematics
- Workplaces: University of California, Berkeley; Northwestern University; University of Chicago
- Thesis: Perverse sheaves on real loop Grassmannians (2001)
- Doctoral advisor: Robert MacPherson
- Website: math.berkeley.edu/~nadler/

David Erie Nadler (born 1973) is an American mathematician who specializes in geometric representation theory and symplectic geometry. He is currently a professor at the University of California, Berkeley.

== Education and career ==
Nadler graduated from Brown University with a B.S. in mathematics in 1996. He completed his doctoral studies at Princeton University under the supervision of Robert MacPherson, earning a Ph.D. in mathematics in 2001. He worked as an instructor at the University of Chicago for several years before taking a tenure track position at Northwestern University in 2005, where he became a Full Professor in 2011. He moved to his current position at the University of California at Berkeley in 2012.

== Recognition ==
In 2007 Nadler was selected as a Sloan Research Fellow, and in 2013 he became a member of the inaugural class of Fellows of the American Mathematical Society.

Nadler delivered the Arf Lecture in 2012.

== Selected works ==
- Nadler, David (2005). "Perverse sheaves on real loop Grassmannians". Invent. Math. 159 (1): 1–73. arXiv:math/0202150. doi:10.1007/s00222-004-0382-3. MR 2142332. S2CID 14234902.
- Nadler, David; Zaslow, Eric (2009). "Constructible sheaves and the Fukaya category". J. Amer. Math. Soc. 22 (1): 233–286. arXiv:math/0604379. Bibcode:2009JAMS...22..233N. doi:10.1090/S0894-0347-08-00612-7. MR 2449059.
- Nadler, David (2009). "Microlocal branes are constructible sheaves". Selecta Math. New Series. 15 (4): 563–619. arXiv:math/0612399. doi:10.1007/s00029-009-0008-0. MR 2565051. S2CID 18624939.
- Ben-Zvi, David; Francis, John; Nadler, David (2010). "Integral transforms and Drinfeld centers in derived algebraic geometry". J. Amer. Math. Soc. 23 (4): 909–966. arXiv:0805.0157. doi:10.1090/S0894-0347-10-00669-7. MR 2669705.
- Ben-Zvi, David; Nadler, David (2012). "Loop spaces and connections". Journal of Topology. 5 (2): 377–430. arXiv:1002.3636. doi:10.1112/jtopol/jts007. MR 2928082. S2CID 115176241.
