= Jean-Luc Brylinski =

French-American mathematician

Jean-Luc Brylinski (born in 1951) is a French-American mathematician. Educated at the Lycée Pasteur and the École Normale Supérieure in Paris, after an appointment as researcher with the C. N. R. S. and as a faculty at Brown University, he became a Professor of Mathematics at Pennsylvania State University in 1988. He proved the Kazhdan–Lusztig conjectures with Masaki Kashiwara. He has also worked on gerbes, cyclic homology, Quillen bundles, and geometric class field theory, among other geometric and algebraic topics.

Brylinski is currently residing in Boston, where he is a CTO and co-CEO of Brylinski Research, together with his wife Ranee Brylinski.

== Books ==
- Loop Spaces, Characteristic Classes and Geometric Quantization (1992)
