= Orbital integral =

Integral transform type in mathematics

In mathematics, an orbital integral is an integral transform that generalizes the spherical mean operator to homogeneous spaces. Instead of integrating over spheres, one integrates over generalized spheres: for a homogeneous space X = G/H, a generalized sphere centered at a point x_{0} is an orbit of the isotropy group of x_{0}.

== Definition ==
The model case for orbital integrals is a Riemannian symmetric space G/K, where G is a Lie group and K is a symmetric compact subgroup. Generalized spheres are then actual geodesic spheres and the spherical averaging operator is defined as

$$M^rf(x) = \int_K f(gk\cdot y)\,dk,$$

where

- the dot denotes the action of the group G on the homogeneous space X
- g ∈ G is a group element such that x = g·o
- y ∈ X is an arbitrary element of the geodesic sphere of radius r centered at x: d(x,y) = r
- the integration is taken with respect to the Haar measure on K (since K is compact, it is unimodular and the left and right Haar measures coincide and can be normalized so that the mass of K is 1).

Orbital integrals of suitable functions can also be defined on homogeneous spaces G/K where the subgroup K is no longer assumed to be compact, but instead is assumed to be only unimodular. Lorentzian symmetric spaces are of this kind. The orbital integrals in this case are also obtained by integrating over a K-orbit in G/K with respect to the Haar measure of K. Thus

$$\int_K f(gk\cdot y)\,dk$$

is the orbital integral centered at x over the orbit through y. As above, g is a group element that represents the coset x.

== Integral geometry ==
A central problem of integral geometry is to reconstruct a function from knowledge of its orbital integrals. The Funk transform and Radon transform are two special cases. When G/K is a Riemannian symmetric space, the problem is trivial, since M^{r}ƒ(x) is the average value of ƒ over the generalized sphere of radius r, and

$$f(x) = \lim_{r\to 0^+} M^rf(x).$$

When K is compact (but not necessarily symmetric), a similar shortcut works. The problem is more interesting when K is non-compact. For example, the Radon transform is the orbital integral that results by taking G to be the Euclidean isometry group and K the isotropy group of a hyperplane.

Orbital integrals are an important technical tool in the theory of automorphic forms, where they enter into the formulation of various trace formulas.
