= Mark Goresky =

Canadian American mathematician

Robert Mark Goresky is a Canadian-American mathematician who invented intersection homology with his advisor and life partner Robert MacPherson.

== Career ==
Goresky received his Ph.D. from Brown University in 1976. His thesis, titled Geometric Cohomology and Homology of Stratified Objects, was written under the direction of MacPherson. Many of the results in his thesis were published in 1981 by the American Mathematical Society. He has taught at the University of British Columbia in Vancouver, and Northeastern University.

== Awards ==
Goresky received a Sloan Research Fellowship in 1981. He received the Coxeter–James Prize in 1984 and the Jeffery-Williams Prize in 1996. In 2002, Goresky and MacPherson were jointly awarded the Leroy P. Steele Prize for Seminal Contribution to Research by the American Mathematical Society. In 2012 Goresky became a fellow of the American Mathematical Society. In 2011 he and Jayce Getz were awarded the Ferran Sunyer i Balaguer Prize for their monograph "Hilbert Modular Forms with Coefficients in Intersection Homology and Quadratic Base Change".

== Personal ==
Goresky's PhD advisor, Robert D. MacPherson, later became his life partner. Their discovery of intersection homology made "both of them famous." After the collapse of the Soviet Union, they were instrumental in channeling aid to Russian mathematicians, especially many who had to hide their sexuality.

== Selected publications ==
- Goresky, Mark; MacPherson, Robert, La dualité de Poincaré pour les espaces singuliers, C. R. Acad. Sci. Paris Sér. A-B 284 (1977), no. 24, A1549–A1551. MR 0440533
- Goresky, Mark; MacPherson, Robert, Intersection homology theory, Topology 19 (1980), no. 2, 135–162. doi:10.1016/0040-9383(80)90003-8 MR 0572580
- Goresky, Mark, Whitney stratified chains and cochains, Trans. Amer. Math. Soc. 267 (1981), 175–196.
- Goresky, Mark; MacPherson, Robert, Intersection homology. II, Inventiones Mathematicae 72 (1983), no. 1, 77–129. doi:10.1007/BF01389130 MR 0696691
- Goresky, Mark; MacPherson, Robert, Stratified Morse Theory, Springer Verlag, N. Y. (1989), Ergebnisse vol. 14.
