= Robert MacPherson (mathematician) =

American mathematician (born 1944)

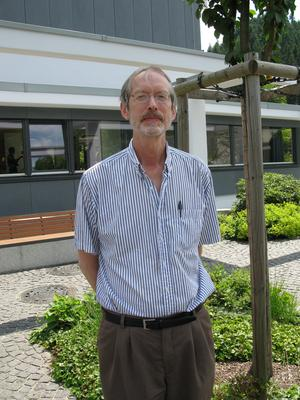
- MacPherson at Oberwolfach in 2008
- Born: May 25, 1944 (age 82); Lakewood, Ohio, U.S.
- Education: Swarthmore College (BA); Harvard University (PhD)
- Known for: Intersection homology
- Awards: NAS Award in Mathematics (1992); Leroy P. Steele Prize (2002); Heinz Hopf Prize (2009)
- Scientific career
- Fields: Mathematics
- Workplaces: Massachusetts Institute of Technology; Brown University; Princeton University
- Thesis: Singularities of Maps and Characteristic Classes (1970)
- Doctoral advisor: Raoul Bott
- Doctoral students: Mark Goresky; David Nadler; Julianna Tymoczko; Kari Vilonen; Zhiwei Yun

Robert Duncan MacPherson (born May 25, 1944) is an American mathematician at the Institute for Advanced Study.

== Early life and education ==
Robert Duncan MacPherson was born in Lakewood, Ohio on May 25, 1944 and grew up in Oak Ridge, Tennessee where his father was the Deputy Director at the Oak Ridge National Laboratory. He received his bachelor's degree from Swarthmore College in 1966. MacPherson then received his PhD from Harvard in 1970 with a thesis, written under the direction of Raoul Bott, entitled Singularities of Maps and Characteristic Classes.

== Career ==
MacPherson was at Brown University as a J. D. Tamarkin Instructor from 1970 to 1972, an assistant professor from 1972 to 1974, an associate professor from 1974 to 1977, and then a professor from 1977 to 1987. He was a professor at the Massachusetts Institute of Technology from 1987 to 1994. He became a professor of mathematics at the Institute for Advanced Study in 1994, later becoming named a Hermann Weyl Professor. He retired and became a professor emeritus 2018.

His notable doctoral students include Mark Goresky, David Nadler, Julianna Tymoczko, Kari Vilonen, and Zhiwei Yun.

== Research ==
MacPherson and Goresky introduced intersection homology. He also worked on arithmetic groups, in particular on Siegel modular threefolds with Mark McConnell and on compactifications of symmetric spaces with Lizhen Ji.

== Honors and awards ==
In 1983, MacPherson gave a plenary address at the International Congress of Mathematicians.

In 1992, MacPherson was awarded the NAS Award in Mathematics from the National Academy of Sciences. In 2002, he and Goresky were awarded the Leroy P. Steele Prize for Seminal Contribution to Research by the American Mathematical Society. In 2009 he received the Heinz Hopf Prize from ETH Zurich.

In 2012, he became a fellow of the American Mathematical Society. He is also a fellow of the National Academy of Sciences and the American Academy of Arts and Sciences.

He received honorary doctorates from the University of Lille in 1993 and Brown University in 1994.

== Personal ==
MacPherson's PhD advisee, Mark Goresky, later became his life partner. After the collapse of the Soviet Union, they were instrumental in channeling aid to Russian mathematicians, especially many who had to hide their sexuality.

== Selected publications ==
- Goresky, Mark; MacPherson, Robert, La dualité de Poincaré pour les espaces singuliers, C. R. Acad. Sci. Paris Sér. A-B 284 (1977), no. 24, A1549–A1551. MR 0440533
- Goresky, Mark; MacPherson, Robert, Intersection homology theory, Topology 19 (1980), no. 2, 135–162. doi:10.1016/0040-9383(80)90003-8 MR 0572580
- Goresky, Mark; MacPherson, Robert, Intersection homology. II, Inventiones Mathematicae 72 (1983), no. 1, 77–129. doi:10.1007/BF01389130 MR 0696691
