= Isomonodromic deformation =

In mathematics, the equations governing the isomonodromic deformation of meromorphic linear systems of ordinary differential equations are, in a fairly precise sense, the most fundamental exact nonlinear differential equations. As a result, their solutions and properties lie at the heart of the field of exact nonlinearity and integrable systems.

Isomonodromic deformations were first studied by Richard Fuchs, with early pioneering contributions from Lazarus Fuchs, Paul Painlevé, René Garnier, and Ludwig Schlesinger. Inspired by results in statistical mechanics, a seminal contribution to the theory was made by Michio Jimbo, Tetsuji Miwa, and Kimio Ueno, who studied cases involving irregular singularities.

== Fuchsian systems and Schlesinger's equations ==
=== Fuchsian system ===
A Fuchsian system is the system of linear differential equations

$$\frac{dy}{dx}=A(x)y=\sum_{i=1}^{n}\frac{A_i}{x-\lambda_i}y$$

where x takes values in the complex projective line $\mathbb{CP}^1$, the y takes values in $\mathbb{C}^n$ and the A_{i} are constant n×n matrices. Solutions to this equation have polynomial growth in the limit x = λ_{i}. By placing n independent column solutions into a fundamental matrix $Y=(y_1,...,y_n)$ then $\frac{dY}{dx}=AY$ and one can regard $Y$ as taking values in $\mathrm{GL}(n, \mathbb{C})$. For simplicity, assume that there is no further pole at infinity, which amounts to the condition that $\sum_{i=1}^{n}A_i=0.$

=== Monodromy data ===
Now, fix a basepoint b on the Riemann sphere away from the poles. Analytic continuation of a fundamental solution $Y_1$ around any pole λ_{i} and back to the basepoint will produce a new solution $Y_2$ defined near b. The new and old solutions are linked by the monodromy matrix M_{i} as follows:

$$Y_2=Y_1M_i.$$

One therefore has the Riemann–Hilbert homomorphism from the fundamental group of the punctured sphere to the monodromy representation:

$$\pi_1 \left (\mathbb{CP}^1 - \{\lambda_1,\dots,\lambda_n\} \right )\to \mathrm{GL}(n,\mathbb{C}).$$

A change of basepoint merely results in a (simultaneous) conjugation of all the monodromy matrices. The monodromy matrices modulo conjugation define the monodromy data of the Fuchsian system.

=== Hilbert's twenty-first problem ===
Now, with given monodromy data, can a Fuchsian system be found which exhibits this monodromy? This is one form of Hilbert's twenty-first problem. One does not distinguish between coordinates x and $\hat{x}$ which are related by Möbius transformations, and also do not distinguish between gauge equivalent Fuchsian systems - this means that A and

$$g^{-1}(x)Ag(x)-g^{-1}(x)\frac{dg(x)}{dx}$$

are regarded as being equivalent for any holomorphic gauge transformation g(x). (It is thus most natural to regard a Fuchsian system geometrically, as a connection with simple poles on a trivial rank n vector bundle over the Riemann sphere).

For generic monodromy data, the answer to Hilbert's twenty-first problem is 'yes'. The first proof was given by Josip Plemelj. However, the proof only holds for generic data, and it was shown in 1989 by Andrei Bolibrukh that there are certain 'degenerate' cases when the answer is 'no'. Here, the generic case is focused upon entirely.

=== Schlesinger's equations ===
There are generically many Fuchsian systems with the same monodromy data. Thus, given any such Fuchsian system with specified monodromy data, isomonodromic deformations can be performed of it. One therefore is led to study families of Fuchsian systems, where the matrices A_{i} depend on the positions of the poles.

In 1912 Ludwig Schlesinger proved that in general, the deformations which preserve the monodromy data of a generic Fuchsian system are governed by the integrable holonomic system of partial differential equations which now bear his name:

$$\begin{align}
\frac{\partial A_i}{\partial \lambda_j} &= \frac{[A_i,A_j]}{\lambda_i-\lambda_j} \qquad \qquad j\neq i \\
\frac{\partial A_i}{\partial \lambda_i} &= -\sum_{j\neq i}\frac{[A_i,A_j]}{\lambda_i-\lambda_j}.
\end{align}$$

The last equation is often written equivalently as $\sum_j \frac{\partial A_i}{\partial \lambda_j} = 0.$

These are the isomonodromy equations for generic Fuchsian systems. The natural interpretation of these equations is as the flatness of a natural connection on a vector bundle over the 'deformation parameter space' which consists of the possible pole positions. For non-generic isomonodromic deformations, there will still be an integrable isomonodromy equation, but it will no longer be Schlesinger.

If one limits attention to the case when the A_{i} take values in the Lie algebra $\mathfrak{sl}(2,\mathbb{C})$, the Garnier integrable systems are obtained. If one specializes further to the case when there are only four poles, then the Schlesinger/Garnier equations can be reduced to the famous sixth Painlevé equation.

== Irregular singularities ==
Motivated by the appearance of Painlevé transcendents in correlation functions in the theory of Bose gases, Michio Jimbo, Tetsuji Miwa and Kimio Ueno extended the notion of isomonodromic deformation to the case of irregular singularities with any order poles, under the following assumption: the leading coefficient at each pole is generic, i.e. it is a diagonalisable matrix with simple spectrum.

The linear system under study is now of the form

$$\frac{dY}{dx}=AY=\sum_{i=1}^{n}\sum_{j=1}^{r_i+1}\frac{A^{(i)}_j}{(x-\lambda_i)^j}Y,$$

with n poles, with the pole at λ_{i} of order $(r_i+1)$. The $A^{(i)}_j$ are constant matrices (and $A^{(i)}_{r_{i+1}}$ is generic for $i = 1,\dotsc,n$).

=== Extended monodromy data ===
As well as the monodromy representation described in the Fuchsian setting, deformations of irregular systems of linear ordinary differential equations are required to preserve extended monodromy data. Roughly speaking, monodromy data is now regarded as data which glues together canonical solutions near the singularities. If one takes $x_i = x - \lambda_i$ as a local coordinate near a pole λ_{i}of order $r_i+1$, one can then solve term-by-term for a holomorphic gauge transformation g such that locally, the system looks like

$$\frac{d(g_i^{-1}Z_i)}{dx_i} = \left(\sum_{j=1}^{r_i} \frac{(-j)T^{(i)}_j}{x_i^{j+1}}+\frac{M^{(i)}}{x_i}\right)(g_i^{-1}Z_i)$$

where $M^{(i)}$ and the $T^{(i)}_j$ are diagonal matrices. If this were valid, it would be extremely useful, because then (at least locally), one has decoupled the system into n scalar differential equations which one can easily solve to find that (locally):

$$Z_i = g_i \exp\left(M^{(i)} \log(x_i)+\sum_{j=1}^{r_i}\frac{T^{(i)}_j}{x_i^{j}}\right).$$

However, this does not work - because the power series solved term-for-term for g will not, in general, converge.

Jimbo, Miwa and Ueno showed that this approach nevertheless provides canonical solutions near the singularities, and can therefore be used to define extended monodromy data. This is due to a theorem of George Birkhoff which states that given such a formal series, there is a unique convergent function G_{i} such that in any sufficiently large sector around the pole, G_{i} is asymptotic to g_{i}, and

$$Y = G_i \exp\left(M^{(i)} \log(x_i)+\sum_{j=1}^{r_i}\frac{T^{(i)}_j}{x_i^{j}}\right).$$

is a true solution of the differential equation. A canonical solution therefore appears in each such sector near each pole. The extended monodromy data consists of

- the data from the monodromy representation as for the Fuchsian case;
- Stokes' matrices which connect canonical solutions between adjacent sectors at the same pole;
- connection matrices that connect canonical solutions between sectors at different poles.

=== Jimbo–Miwa–Ueno isomonodromic deformations ===
As before, one now considers families of systems of linear differential equations, all with the same (generic) singularity structure. One therefore allows the matrices $A^{(i)}_j$ to depend on parameters. One is allowed to vary the positions of the poles λ_{i}, but now, in addition, one also varies the entries of the diagonal matrices $T^{(i)}_j$ which appear in the canonical solution near each pole.

Jimbo, Miwa and Ueno proved that if one defines a one-form on the 'deformation parameter space' by

$$\Omega = \sum_{i=1}^{n}\left(A d\lambda_i - g_i D \left( \sum_{j=1}^{r_i}T^{(i)}_j \right)g_i^{-1} \right)$$

(where D denotes exterior differentiation with respect to the components of the $T^{(i)}_j$ only)

then deformations of the meromorphic linear system specified by A are isomonodromic if and only if

$$dA + [\Omega,A] + \frac{d\Omega}{dx} = 0.$$

These are the Jimbo—Miwa—Ueno isomonodromy equations. As before, these equations can be interpreted as the flatness of a natural connection on the deformation parameter space.

== Properties ==
The isomonodromy equations enjoy a number of properties that justify their status as nonlinear special functions.

=== Painlevé property ===
This is perhaps the most important property of a solution to the isomonodromic deformation equations. This means that all essential singularities of the solutions are fixed, although the positions of poles may move. It was proved by Bernard Malgrange for the case of Fuchsian systems, and by Tetsuji Miwa in the general setting.

Indeed, suppose that one is given a partial differential equation (or a system of them). Then, 'possessing a reduction to an isomonodromy equation' is more or less equivalent to the Painlevé property, and can therefore be used as a test for integrability.

=== Transcendence ===
In general, solutions of the isomonodromy equations cannot be expressed in terms of simpler functions such as solutions of linear differential equations. However, for particular (more precisely, reducible) choices of extended monodromy data, solutions can be expressed in terms of such functions (or at least, in terms of 'simpler' isomonodromy transcendents). The study of precisely what this transcendence means has been largely carried out by the invention of 'nonlinear differential Galois theory' by Hiroshi Umemura and Bernard Malgrange.

There are also very special solutions which are algebraic. The study of such algebraic solutions involves examining the topology of the deformation parameter space (and in particular, its mapping class group); for the case of simple poles, this amounts to the study of the action of braid groups. For the particularly important case of the sixth Painlevé equation, there has been a notable contribution by Boris Dubrovin and Marta Mazzocco, which has been recently extended to larger classes of monodromy data by Philip Boalch.

Rational solutions are often associated with special polynomials. Sometimes, as in the case of the sixth Painlevé equation, these are well-known orthogonal polynomials, but there are new classes of polynomials with an extremely interesting distribution of zeros and interlacing properties. The study of such polynomials has largely been carried out by Peter Clarkson and collaborators.

=== Symplectic structure ===
The isomonodromy equations can be rewritten using Hamiltonian formulations. This viewpoint was extensively pursued by Kazuo Okamoto in a series of papers on the Painlevé equations in the 1980s.

They can also be regarding as a natural extension of the Atiyah–Bott symplectic structure on spaces of flat connections on Riemann surfaces to the world of meromorphic geometry - a perspective pursued by Philip Boalch. Indeed, if one fixes the positions of the poles, one can even obtain complete hyperkähler manifolds; a result proved by Olivier Biquard and Philip Boalch.

There is another description in terms of moment maps to (central extensions of) loop algebras - a viewpoint introduced by John Harnad and extended to the case of general singularity structure by Nick Woodhouse. This latter perspective is intimately related to a curious Laplace transform between isomonodromy equations with different pole structure and rank for the underlying equations.

=== Twistor structure ===
The isomonodromy equations arise as (generic) full dimensional reductions of (generalized) anti-self-dual Yang–Mills equations. By the Penrose–Ward transform they can therefore be interpreted in terms of holomorphic vector bundles on complex manifolds called twistor spaces. This allows the use of powerful techniques from algebraic geometry in studying the properties of transcendents. This approach has been pursued by Nigel Hitchin, Lionel Mason and Nick Woodhouse.

=== Gauss-Manin connections ===
By considering data associated with families of Riemann surfaces branched over the singularities, one can consider the isomonodromy equations as nonhomogeneous Gauss–Manin connections. This leads to alternative descriptions of the isomonodromy equations in terms of abelian functions - an approach known to Fuchs and Painlevé, but lost until rediscovery by Yuri Manin in 1996.

=== Asymptotics ===
Particular transcendents can be characterized by their asymptotic behaviour. The study of such behaviour goes back to the early days of isomonodromy, in work by Pierre Boutroux and others.

== Applications ==
Their universality as some of the simplest nonlinear integrable systems means that the isomonodromy equations have a diverse range of applications. Perhaps of greatest practical importance is the field of random matrix theory. Here, the statistical properties of eigenvalues of large random matrices are described by particular transcendents.

The initial impetus for the resurgence of interest in isomonodromy in the 1970s was the appearance of transcendents in correlation functions in Bose gases.

They provide generating functions for moduli spaces of two-dimensional topological quantum field theories and are thereby useful in the study of quantum cohomology and Gromov–Witten invariants.

'Higher-order' isomonodromy equations have recently been used to explain the mechanism and universality properties of shock formation for the dispersionless limit of the Korteweg–de Vries equation.

They are natural reductions of the Ernst equation and thereby provide solutions to the Einstein field equations of general relativity; they also give rise to other (quite distinct) solutions of the Einstein equations in terms of theta functions.

They have arisen in recent work in mirror symmetry - both in the geometric Langlands programme, and in work on the moduli spaces of stability conditions on derived categories.

== Generalizations ==
The isomonodromy equations have been generalized for meromorphic connections on a general Riemann surface.

They can also easily be adapted to take values in any Lie group, by replacing the diagonal matrices by the maximal torus, and other similar modifications.

There is a burgeoning field studying discrete versions of isomonodromy equations.
