= Loop group =

Mathematical group of loops in a Lie group

In mathematics, a loop group is, in the most common Lie-theoretic sense, the group LG = C^{∞}(S^{1}, G) of smooth maps from the circle S^{1} to a Lie group G, with multiplication defined pointwise. When G is a compact Lie group, LG is a basic example of an infinite-dimensional Lie group, with Lie algebra L𝔤 = C^{∞}(S^{1}, 𝔤).

The subgroup ΩG of based loops is fundamental in homotopy theory, while central extensions of loop groups and their projective representations are closely related to affine Kac–Moody algebras, conformal field theory, and the Verlinde formula. In algebraic geometry one also studies algebraic loop groups, defined by LG(R) = G(R((t))), together with their associated affine Grassmannians and affine flag varieties.

== Definition ==
Let G be a topological group. The set C(S^{1},G) of continuous maps from the circle to G becomes a topological group under pointwise multiplication when equipped with the compact-open topology. Since S^{1} is compact, this is the same as the topology of uniform convergence.

In Lie theory one usually considers the group

$$LG=C^\infty(S^1,G)$$

of smooth loops in a finite-dimensional Lie group G. It is endowed with the smooth compact-open topology, namely the initial topology induced by the iterated tangent maps

$$C^\infty(S^1,G)\to \prod_{k\ge 0} C(T^kS^1,T^kG).$$

With this topology, LG is an infinite-dimensional Lie group.

Its Lie algebra is

$$L\mathfrak g=C^\infty(S^1,\mathfrak g),$$

with pointwise bracket. Since S^{1} is compact, the smooth compact-open topology on $L\mathfrak g$ is the Fréchet topology of uniform convergence of all derivatives on S^{1}; equivalently, after choosing an angular coordinate on S^{1} and a norm on $\mathfrak g$, it is defined by the seminorms

$p_n(X)=\sup_{\theta\in S^1}\|X^{(n)}(\theta)\| \qquad (n\ge 0).$

For compact G, smooth loop groups are modeled on nuclear Fréchet spaces.

== Basic constructions ==
=== Free and based loop groups ===
The free loop group of G is LG itself. The based loop group is

$$\Omega G = \{\gamma \in LG : \gamma(1)=e\},$$

the kernel of the evaluation map

$$\operatorname{ev}_1 : LG \to G, \qquad \gamma \mapsto \gamma(1).$$

Thus ΩG is a closed normal subgroup of LG. The inclusion of constant loops gives a splitting of ev_{1}, so there is a split exact sequence

$$1 \to \Omega G \to LG \xrightarrow{\operatorname{ev}_1} G \to 1,$$

and hence a semidirect product decomposition

$LG \cong \Omega G \rtimes G.$

=== Relation with loop spaces ===
As a topological space, ΩG is the based loop space of G. Its pointwise product and the usual concatenation of based loops are different operations, but they induce the same multiplication up to homotopy; this is a manifestation of the Eckmann–Hilton argument.

=== Basic topology ===
The splitting of the evaluation map

$$\operatorname{ev}_1:LG\to G$$

by constant loops identifies LG with G × ΩG as a topological space:

$$LG \cong G\times \Omega G, \qquad
\gamma \mapsto \bigl(\gamma(1),\,\gamma(1)^{-1}\gamma\bigr).$$

Thus the topology of LG is determined by that of G together with the based loop space ΩG.

In particular, the connected components of LG are classified by

$$\pi_0(LG)\cong \pi_0(G)\times \pi_0(\Omega G).$$

If G is connected, then $\pi_0(\Omega G)\cong \pi_1(G)$, so

$$\pi_0(LG)\cong \pi_1(G).$$

Hence LG is connected whenever G is simply connected.

More generally, for each k ≥ 1,

$$\pi_k(LG)\cong \pi_k(G)\oplus \pi_k(\Omega G)
\cong \pi_k(G)\oplus \pi_{k+1}(G).$$

Thus the homotopy groups of a loop group are determined by those of G shifted by one degree together with those of G itself.

These elementary identifications are one reason loop groups are important in algebraic topology. In the unitary case they are closely related to Bott periodicity, and Segal's Grassmannian model of the homogeneous space LG/G ≅ ΩG makes this relation explicit.

=== Rotation action and positive energy ===
Besides pointwise multiplication, loop groups carry a natural action of the circle by rotating the parameter:

$$(R_\phi \gamma)(e^{i\theta})=\gamma(e^{i(\theta+\phi)}).$$

This allows one to form the semidirect product

$$T_{\mathrm{rot}}\ltimes LG,$$

where T_{rot} acts on LG by rotation.

This action is the starting point for the theory of positive-energy representations. A representation of LG is said to have positive energy if it is equipped with a positive action of T_{rot} making it a representation of $T_{\mathrm{rot}}\ltimes LG$. In Segal's formulation, the action of $e^{i\phi}\in T_{\mathrm{rot}}$ is positive if it is given by $e^{iA\phi}$ for an operator A whose spectrum is bounded below.

For compact G, irreducible positive-energy representations are a distinguished class of projective representations of loop groups. They extend holomorphically to the complexified loop group and decompose into finite-dimensional energy eigenspaces. For this reason, the representation theory of loop groups of a compact G often resembles that of compact groups.

== Infinite-dimensional Lie group structure ==
If G is a finite-dimensional Lie group, then suitable spaces of loops in G inherit infinite-dimensional manifold structures. For smooth loops, LG is a Fréchet Lie group, and its Lie algebra is the loop algebra

$$L\mathfrak{g} = C^\infty(S^1,\mathfrak{g}),$$

with pointwise bracket

$[X,Y](z)=[X(z),Y(z)].$

The exponential map is induced pointwise from that of G:

$$\exp_{LG}(X)(z)=\exp_G(X(z)).$$

For compact G, loop groups are among the simplest and most studied examples of infinite-dimensional Lie groups.

To develop differential geometry on loop groups one often uses Sobolev completions L_{s}G. In particular, based loop groups of compact, connected, simply connected, simple Lie groups carry natural geometric structures, including Kähler metrics in the Hilbert-manifold setting.

== Homogeneous spaces and factorization ==
The quotient LG/G, where G is embedded as the subgroup of constant loops, can be identified with ΩG. This homogeneous-space viewpoint is central in the geometry of loop groups.

If G is compact and G_{ℂ} is its complexification, then the complexified loop group LG_{ℂ} admits factorization phenomena analogous to Birkhoff factorization and Bruhat decomposition. These decompositions play a major role in the geometry of loop groups, the theory of Toeplitz operators, and the construction of solutions to integrable systems.

== Central extensions and representation theory ==
Many natural representations attached to the loop group are not honest representations of LG, but of a central extension of LG by the circle group U(1).

For a compact Lie group G, integral classes in H^{4}(BG;Z) give rise, by transgression, to central extensions of the loop group. Such extensions are often described by a level. The corresponding projective unitary representations include the integrable highest-weight or positive-energy representations, which are closely related to representations of the associated affine Kac–Moody algebra.

The representation theory of loop groups is also linked to the Verlinde ring and to twisted equivariant K-theory. In work of Freed, Hopkins, and Teleman, the Verlinde ring of positive-energy representations is identified with an appropriate twisted equivariant K-group of G.

== Twisted loop groups ==
Let σ be an automorphism of G of finite order m. The corresponding twisted loop group consists of smooth maps γ:R→G satisfying

$$\gamma(\theta+2\pi)=\sigma(\gamma(\theta)).$$

Equivalently, after passing to the circle, one may regard twisted loops as sections of a bundle over S^{1} with monodromy σ.

Twisted loop groups occur naturally in the theory of affine Dynkin diagrams, in representation theory, and in the theory of affine flag varieties. They include the twisted affine Kac–Moody types as Lie-algebraic counterparts.

== Algebraic loop groups ==
In algebraic geometry and arithmetic geometry, one replaces smooth loops by Laurent series. If G is an algebraic group over a field k, its algebraic loop group is the functor

$$LG(R)=G(R((t)))$$

on k-algebras R. The associated positive loop group is

$L^+G(R)=G(R[[t]]).$

These objects underlie the theory of the affine Grassmannian

$$\operatorname{Gr}_G = LG/L^+G$$

and affine flag varieties, which are central in geometric representation theory, the geometric Langlands program, and the theory of local models of Shimura varieties.

== Complex and holomorphic loop groups ==
If G is a compact Lie group with complexification G_{C}, then the smooth loop group LG has a complexification

$$LG_{\mathbf C}=C^\infty(S^1,G_{\mathbf C}).$$

This is one of the special features of loop groups among infinite-dimensional Lie groups.

A closely related role is played by subgroups of loops that extend holomorphically across one of the discs bounded by S^{1}. Writing D for the unit disc and D^{*} for its exterior, one defines subgroups L^{+}G_{C} and L^{-}G_{C} consisting of boundary values of holomorphic maps D→G_{\mathbf C} and D^{*}→G_{C}, respectively.

These holomorphic subgroups enter the Birkhoff factorization theorem, according to which a loop in G_{\mathbf C} can, on suitable strata, be written in the form

$$\gamma=\gamma_-\,\lambda\,\gamma_+,$$

where γ_{−} \in L^{−}G_{C}, γ_{+} \in L^{+}G_{C}, and λ:S^{1}→T is a homomorphism into a maximal torus. This factorization is the infinite-dimensional analogue of Bruhat decomposition and underlies much of the geometry of homogeneous spaces of loop groups.

Holomorphic methods also enter representation theory. In Segal's Borel–Weil picture, positive-energy representations are realized as spaces of holomorphic sections of line bundles over homogeneous spaces attached to loop groups, and every irreducible positive-energy representation extends to a holomorphic representation of the complexified loop group.

== Examples ==
The simplest nontrivial example is G = S^{1}. In this case, smooth loops are classified up to connected component by their winding number. More generally, if T is a torus with Lie algebra 𝔱 and cocharacter lattice

$$\Pi=\exp^{-1}(1)/(2\pi)\subset \mathfrak t,$$

then the loop group has a canonical decomposition

$$LT \cong T \times \Pi \times U,$$

where

$$U=\exp(V), \qquad
V=\left\{\beta:S^1\to \mathfrak t \;|\; \int_{S^1}\beta(s)\,ds=0\right\}.$$

In particular, the connected components of LT are indexed by $\Pi\cong \pi_1(T)$. For T = S^{1}, this gives

$$LS^1 \cong S^1 \times \mathbf Z \times U,$$

so the components of LS^{1} are indexed by the integers.

== Index theory ==
Loop groups enter index theory in several related ways. One of the earliest is through the determinant line bundle on the infinite-dimensional Grassmannian associated with a loop group. In the Grassmannian model used by Pressley, Segal, and others, this line bundle is tied to the basic central extension of the loop group and to geometric realizations of its representations.

Analytic index theory also appears through families of Toeplitz operators and through spectral flow. In the torus case, Freed, Hopkins, and Teleman describe a family of Dirac operators whose spectral flow gives the basic topological class needed for their construction of twisted K-theory classes associated with loop-group representations.

A deeper connection comes from the Dirac family attached to a positive-energy representation of a loop group. In the work of Freed, Hopkins, and Teleman, such families of Fredholm operators produce classes in twisted equivariant K-theory, and this construction is one of the ingredients in their identification of the Verlinde ring with twisted equivariant K-theory of G.

These index-theoretic constructions link loop-group representation theory with geometric quantization, central extensions, and the topology of the group G itself.

== Applications ==
Loop groups arise in several areas of mathematics and mathematical physics.

- In algebraic topology, the based loop group ΩG is a basic example of an H-space and is closely related to the homotopy type of G.
- In representation theory, loop groups and their central extensions lead to affine Kac–Moody algebras and positive-energy representations.
- In algebraic geometry, algebraic loop groups give rise to affine Grassmannians and affine flag varieties.
- In mathematical physics, loop groups occur in conformal field theory, Chern–Simons theory, and twisted equivariant K-theory.

=== Integrable systems ===
Loop groups play a central role in the modern theory of integrable systems. A large class of nonlinear evolution equations can be written in Lax pair or zero-curvature form with a complex spectral parameter λ. When the coefficients depend rationally or Laurent-polynomially on λ and take values in a Lie algebra 𝔤, they may be viewed as elements of a loop algebra L𝔤. Splittings of loop algebras into positive and negative parts, together with factorization in the corresponding loop groups, then produce commuting hierarchies of flows and solution-generating procedures.

A basic example is the KdV hierarchy. In their study of equations of KdV type, Segal and Wilson showed that a large class of solutions can be constructed from points of an infinite-dimensional Grassmannian associated with a loop group. In this picture the commuting flows are induced by the action of a positive loop subgroup, and the corresponding solutions are described in terms of Baker functions and tau functions.

Loop-group factorization also underlies dressing transformations and Bäcklund transformations. Terng and Uhlenbeck formulated conservation laws, scattering theory, hierarchies, and Bäcklund transformations within a common framework of loop-group actions, particularly for the ZS–AKNS hierarchy, which includes the nonlinear Schrödinger equation, modified KdV, and the n-wave equation.

The same methods occur in differential geometry. Loop-group constructions are used for harmonic maps into Lie groups and symmetric spaces, the chiral model, and a range of geometric integrable systems such as constant-mean-curvature and isothermic surfaces. In compact cases, global Birkhoff- and Iwasawa-type decompositions strengthen the dressing method and lead to global Weierstrass-type representations for some geometric integrable systems.

=== Hodge theory ===
Loop groups also appear in a more specialized interaction with Hodge theory. In work of Jeremy Daniel, a loop Hodge structure is defined as an infinite-dimensional analogue of a Hodge structure incorporating features of loop-group geometry, and variations of loop Hodge structures are shown to be equivalent to harmonic bundles.

From this point of view, non-abelian Hodge theory can be expressed in terms of period maps with values in infinite-dimensional period domains related to loop-group constructions.

== Current groups ==
A current group generalizes a loop group, replacing the circle with a smooth manifold M. Thus a current group is the group of smooth mappings from M into G, with multiplication defined pointwise:

$$C^\infty(M,G)=\{f:M\to G \mid f \text{ is smooth}\}, \qquad (f_1f_2)(x)=f_1(x)f_2(x).$$

More generally, Segal described the mapping groups $\operatorname{Map}(X,G)$ for compact manifolds X as higher-dimensional analogues of loop groups, noting that in mathematical physics they occur as current groups and gauge groups.

If G is a topological group, the continuous mapping space C(M,G) becomes a topological group with the compact-open topology. For smooth maps one usually uses the smooth compact-open topology. Under suitable hypotheses on M and G, this gives C^{∞}(M,G) a natural infinite-dimensional Lie group structure. Its Lie algebra is the corresponding current algebra

$$C^\infty(M,\mathfrak g),$$

with pointwise Lie bracket.

For non-compact manifolds one often studies the compactly supported current group C^{∞}_{c}(M,G), or more generally section groups Γ_{c}(M,𝒢) of bundles of Lie groups over M. Gauge groups of principal bundles are of this form: if Ξ→M is a principal G-bundle, then its gauge group is isomorphic to the section group Γ(M,Ad(Ξ)), and the compactly supported gauge group to Γ_{c}(M,Ad(Ξ)).

Current groups occur naturally in quantum field theory and gauge theory. Compared with loop groups, however, their general representation theory is much less fully developed; much of the recent work has focused on central extensions and on special classes of representations, such as bounded or positive-energy representations of gauge groups.

== See also ==
- Affine Grassmannian
- Affine Kac–Moody algebra
- Loop algebra
- Loop space
- Topological group
- Virasoro group
