= Tau function (integrable systems) =

Generating function in integrable systems

Tau functions are an important ingredient in the modern mathematical theory of integrable systems, and have numerous applications in a variety of other domains. They were originally introduced by Ryogo Hirota in his direct method approach to soliton equations, based on expressing them in an equivalent bilinear form.

The term tau function, or $\tau$-function, was first used systematically by Mikio Sato and his students in the specific context of the Kadomtsev–Petviashvili (or KP) equation and related integrable hierarchies. It is a central ingredient in the theory of solitons. In this setting, given any $\tau$-function satisfying a Hirota-type system of bilinear equations (see § Hirota bilinear residue relation for KP tau functions below), the corresponding solutions of the equations of the integrable hierarchy are explicitly expressible in terms of it and its logarithmic derivatives up to a finite order. Tau functions also appear as matrix model partition functions in the spectral theory of random matrices, and may also serve as generating functions, in the sense of combinatorics and enumerative geometry, especially in relation to moduli spaces of Riemann surfaces, and enumeration of branched coverings, or so-called Hurwitz numbers.

There are two notions of $\tau$-functions, both introduced by the Sato school. The first is isospectral $\tau$-functions of the Sato–Segal–Wilson type for integrable hierarchies, such as the KP hierarchy, which are parametrized by linear operators satisfying isospectral deformation equations of Lax type. The second is isomonodromic $\tau$-functions.

Depending on the specific application, a $\tau$-function may either be: 1) an analytic function of a finite or infinite number of independent, commuting flow variables, or deformation parameters; 2) a discrete function of a finite or infinite number of denumerable variables; 3) a formal power series expansion in a finite or infinite number of expansion variables, which need have no convergence domain, but serves as generating function for certain enumerative invariants appearing as the coefficients of the series; 4) a finite or infinite (Fredholm) determinant whose entries are either specific polynomial or quasi-polynomial functions, or parametric integrals, and their derivatives; 5) the Pfaffian of a skew symmetric matrix (either finite or infinite dimensional) with entries similarly of polynomial or quasi-polynomial type. Examples of all these types are given below.

In the Hamilton–Jacobi approach to Liouville integrable Hamiltonian systems, Hamilton's principal function, evaluated on the level surfaces of a complete set of Poisson commuting invariants, plays a role similar to the $\tau$-function, serving both as a generating function for the canonical transformation to linearizing canonical coordinates and, when evaluated on simultaneous level sets of a complete set of Poisson commuting invariants, as a complete solution of the Hamilton–Jacobi equation.

== Tau functions: isospectral and isomonodromic ==
A $\tau$-function of isospectral type is defined as a solution of the Hirota bilinear equations (see § Hirota bilinear residue relation for KP tau functions below), from which the linear operator undergoing isospectral evolution can be uniquely reconstructed. Geometrically, in the Sato and Segal-Wilson sense, it is the value of the determinant of a Fredholm integral operator, interpreted as the orthogonal projection of an element of a suitably defined (infinite dimensional) Grassmann manifold onto the origin, as that element evolves under the linear exponential action of a maximal abelian subgroup of the general linear group. It typically arises as a partition function, in the sense of statistical mechanics, many-body quantum mechanics or quantum field theory, as the underlying measure undergoes a linear exponential deformation.

Isomonodromic $\tau$-functions for linear systems of Fuchsian type are defined below in § Fuchsian isomonodromic systems. Schlesinger equations. For the more general case of linear ordinary differential equations with rational coefficients, including irregular singularities, they are developed in reference.

=== Hirota bilinear residue relation for KP tau functions ===
A KP (Kadomtsev–Petviashvili) $\tau$-function $\tau(\mathbf{t})$ is a function of an infinite collection $\mathbf{t}=(t_1, t_2, \dots)$ of variables (called KP flow variables) that satisfies the bilinear formal residue equation

$\mathrm{res}_{z=0}\left(e^{\sum_{i=1}^\infty (\delta t_i)z^i} \tau({\bf t} - [z^{-1}])\tau({\bf s} + [z^{-1}])\right)dz \equiv 0,$	1

identically in the $\delta t_j$ variables, where $\mathrm{res}_{z=0}$ is the $z^{-1}$ coefficient in the formal Laurent expansion resulting from expanding all factors as Laurent series in $z$, and

$${\bf s} := {\bf t} + (\delta t_1, \delta t_2, \cdots  ), \quad [z^{-1}] := (z^{-1}, \tfrac{z^{-2}}{2}, \cdots \tfrac{z^{-j}}{j}, \cdots).$$

As explained below in the section § Formal Baker-Akhiezer function and the KP hierarchy, every such $\tau$-function determines a set of solutions to the equations of the KP hierarchy.

=== Kadomtsev–Petviashvili equation ===
If $\tau(t_1, t_2, t_3, \dots\dots)$ is a KP $\tau$-function satisfying the Hirota residue equation (1) and we identify the first three flow variables as

$$t_1 =x, \quad t_2=y,\quad t_3 =t,$$

it follows that the function

$$u(x,y,t):=2\frac{\partial^2}{\partial x^2}\log\left(\tau(x,y,t, t_4,\dots)\right)$$

satisfies the $2$ (spatial)$+1$ (time) dimensional nonlinear partial differential equation

$3u_{yy}=\left(4u_t-6uu_x-u_{xxx}\right)_x,$	2

known as the Kadomtsev-Petviashvili (KP) equation. This equation plays a prominent role in plasma physics and in shallow water ocean waves.

Taking further logarithmic derivatives of $\tau(t_1, t_2, t_3, \dots\dots)$ gives an infinite sequence of functions that satisfy further systems of nonlinear autonomous PDE's, each involving partial derivatives of finite order with respect to a finite number of the KP flow parameters ${\bf t} =(t_1, t_2, \dots )$. These are collectively known as the KP hierarchy.

=== Formal Baker–Akhiezer function and the KP hierarchy ===
If we define the (formal) Baker-Akhiezer function $\psi(z, \mathbf{t})$ by Sato's formula

$$\psi(z, \mathbf{t}) :=
e^{\sum_{i=1}^\infty t_i z^i}
\frac{\tau(\mathbf{t} - [z^{-1}])}{\tau(\mathbf{t})}$$

and expand it as a formal series in the powers of the variable $z$

$$\psi(z, \mathbf{t}) = e^{\sum_{i=1}^\infty t_i z^i}
( 1 + \sum_{j=1}^\infty w_j(\mathbf{t}) z^{-j}),$$

this satisfies an infinite sequence of compatible evolution equations

$\frac{\partial \psi }{\partial t_i} = \mathcal{D}_i \psi, \quad i,j, = 1,2, \dots,$	3

where $\mathcal{D}_i$ is a linear ordinary differential operator of degree $i$ in the variable $x:= t_1$, with coefficients that are functions of the flow variables $\mathbf{t}=(t_1, t_2, \dots)$, defined as follows

$$\mathcal{D}_i := \big(\mathcal{L}^i\big)_+$$

where $\mathcal{L}$ is the formal pseudo-differential operator

$$\mathcal{L} = \partial + \sum_{j=1}^\infty  u_j(\mathbf{t}) \partial^{-j}
= \mathcal{W} \circ\partial \circ{\mathcal{W}}^{-1}$$

with $\partial := \frac{\partial}{\partial x}$,

$$\mathcal{W} := 1 +\sum_{j=1}^\infty w_j(\mathbf{t}) \partial^{-j}$$

is the wave operator and $\big(\mathcal{L}^i\big)_+$ denotes the projection to the part of $\mathcal{L}^i$ containing purely non-negative powers of $\partial$; i.e. the differential operator part of ${\mathcal{L}}^i$ .

The pseudodifferential operator $\mathcal{L}$ satisfies the infinite system of isospectral deformation equations

$\frac{\partial\mathcal{L} }{\partial t_i} = [\mathcal{D}_i, \mathcal{L} ], \quad i, = 1,2, \dots$	4

and the compatibility conditions for both the system (3) and (4) are

$\frac{\partial\mathcal{D}_i}{\partial t_j} - \frac{\partial\mathcal{D}_j}{\partial t_i} + [\mathcal{D}_i, \mathcal{D}_j]=0, \quad i,j, = 1,2, \dots$	5

This is a compatible infinite system of nonlinear partial differential equations, known as the KP (Kadomtsev-Petviashvili) hierarchy, for the functions $\{u_j(\mathbf{t})\}_{j\in \mathbf{N}}$, with respect to the set $\mathbf{t}=(t_1, t_2, \dots)$ of independent variables, each of which contains only a finite number of $u_j$'s, and derivatives only with respect to the three independent variables $(x, t_i, t_j)$. The first nontrivial case of these is the Kadomtsev-Petviashvili equation (2).

Thus, every KP $\tau$-function provides a solution, at least in the formal sense, of this infinite system of nonlinear partial differential equations.

== Isomonodromic systems. Isomonodromic tau functions ==
=== Fuchsian isomonodromic systems. Schlesinger equations ===
Consider the overdetermined system of first order matrix partial differential equations

${\partial \Psi \over \partial z}- \sum_{i=1}^n {N_i \over z - \alpha_i} \Psi=0, \quad$	6

${\partial \Psi \over \partial \alpha_i}+ {N_i \over z - \alpha_i} \Psi=0,$	7

where $\{N_i\}_{i=1, \dots, n}$ are a set of $n$ $r\times r$ traceless matrices, $\{\alpha_i\}_{i=1, \dots, n}$ a set of $n$ complex parameters, $z$ a complex variable, and $\Psi(z, \alpha_1, \dots, \alpha_m)$ is an invertible $r \times r$ matrix valued function of $z$ and $\{\alpha_i\}_{i=1, \dots, n}$. These are the necessary and sufficient conditions for the based monodromy representation of the fundamental group $\pi_1({\bf P}^1\backslash\{\alpha_i\}_{i=1, \dots, n})$ of the Riemann sphere punctured at the points $\{\alpha_i\}_{i=1, \dots, n}$ corresponding to the rational covariant derivative operator

$${\partial  \over \partial z}- \sum_{i=1}^n {N_i \over z - \alpha_i}$$

to be independent of the parameters $\{\alpha_i\}_{i=1, \dots, n}$; i.e. that changes in these parameters induce an isomonodromic deformation. The compatibility conditions for this system are the Schlesinger equations

${\partial N_i \over \partial \alpha_j} = {[N_i, N_j] \over \alpha_i-\alpha_j} \quad \text{for } i \neq j, \quad {\partial N_i \over \partial \alpha_i} = - \sum_{1\le j \le n, j\neq i}{[N_i, N_j] \over \alpha_i-\alpha_j}.$	8

=== Isomonodromic $\tau$-function ===
Defining $n$ functions

$H_i := \frac{1}{2} \sum_{1\le j \le n, j\neq i}{{\rm Tr}(N_i N_j) \over \alpha_i-\alpha_j}, \quad i=1, \dots ,n,$	9

the Schlesinger equations (8) imply that the differential form

$$\omega := \sum_{i=1}^n H_i d\alpha_i$$

on the space of parameters is closed:

$$d\omega = 0$$

and hence, locally exact. Therefore, at least locally, there exists a function $\tau(\alpha_1, \dots, \alpha_n)$ of the parameters, defined within a multiplicative constant, such that

$$\omega = d\mathrm{ln}\tau$$

The function $\tau(\alpha_1, \dots, \alpha_n)$ is called the isomonodromic $\tau$-function associated to the fundamental solution $\Psi$ of the system (6), (7).

=== Hamiltonian structure of the Schlesinger equations ===
Defining the Lie Poisson brackets on the space of $n$-tuples $\{N_i\}_{i=1, \dots, n}$ of $r \times r$ matrices:

$$\{(N_i)_{ab}, (N_j)_{c,d}\} =
\delta_{ij}\left((N_i)_{ad}\delta_{bc} - (N_i)_{cb}\delta_{ad}\right)$$
$$1 \le i,j \le n, \quad 1\le a,b,c,d \le r,$$

and viewing the $n$ functions $\{H_i\}_{i=1, \dots,n}$ defined in (9) as Hamiltonian functions on this Poisson space, the Schlesinger equations (8) may be expressed in Hamiltonian form as

$$\frac{\partial f(N_1, \dots, N_n)}{\partial \alpha_i} = \{f, H_i\}, \quad 1\le i \le n$$

for any differentiable function $f(N_1, \dots, N_n)$.

=== Reduction of $r=2$, $n=3$ case to $P_{VI}$ ===
The simplest nontrivial case of the Schlesinger equations is when $r=2$ and $n=3$. By applying a Möbius transformation to the variable $z$, two of the finite poles may be chosen to be at $0$ and $1$, and the third viewed as the independent variable. Setting the sum $\sum_{i=1}^3 N_i$ of the matrices appearing in (6), which is an invariant of the Schlesinger equations, equal to a constant, and quotienting by its stabilizer under $Gl(2)$ conjugation, we obtain a system equivalent to the most generic case $P_{VI}$ of the six Painlevé transcendent equations, for which many detailed classes of explicit solutions are known.

=== Non-Fuchsian isomonodromic systems ===
For non-Fuchsian systems, with higher order poles, the generalized monodromy data include Stokes matrices and connection matrices, and there are further isomonodromic deformation parameters associated with the local asymptotics, but the isomonodromic $\tau$-functions may be defined in a similar way, using differentials on the extended parameter space. There is similarly a Poisson bracket structure on the space of rational matrix valued functions of the spectral parameter $z$ and corresponding spectral invariant Hamiltonians that generate the isomonodromic deformation dynamics.

Taking all possible confluences of the poles appearing in (6) for the $r=2$ and $n=3$ case, including the one at $z=\infty$, and making the corresponding reductions, we obtain all other instances $P_{I} \cdots P_V$ of the Painlevé transcendents, for which numerous special solutions are also known.

== Fermionic VEV (vacuum expectation value) representations ==
The fermionic Fock space $\mathcal{F}$, is a semi-infinite exterior product space

$$\mathcal{F} = \Lambda^{\infty/2}\mathcal{H} = \oplus_{n\in \mathbf{Z}}\mathcal{F}_n$$

defined on a (separable) Hilbert space $\mathcal{H}$ with basis elements $\{e_i\}_{i\in \mathbf{Z}}$ and dual basis elements $\{e^i\}_{i\in \mathbf{Z}}$ for $\mathcal{H}^*$.

The free fermionic creation and annihilation operators $\{\psi_j, \psi^{\dagger}_j\}_{j \in \mathbf{Z}}$ act as endomorphisms on $\mathcal{F}$ via exterior and interior multiplication by the basis elements

$$\psi_i := e_i \wedge, \quad \psi^\dagger_i := i_{e^i}, \quad i \in \mathbf{Z},$$

and satisfy the canonical anti-commutation relations

$$[\psi_i,\psi_k]_+ = [\psi^\dagger_i,\psi^\dagger_k]_+= 0, \quad  [\psi_i,\psi^\dagger_k]_+= \delta_{ij}.$$

These generate the standard fermionic representation of the Clifford algebra on the direct sum $\mathcal{H} +\mathcal{H}^*$, corresponding to the scalar product

$$Q(u + \mu, w + \nu) := \nu(u) + \mu(v), \quad u,v \in \mathcal{H},\ \mu, \nu \in \mathcal{H}^*$$

with the Fock space $\mathcal{F}$ as irreducible module. Denote the vacuum state, in the zero fermionic charge sector $\mathcal{F}_0$, as

$$|0\rangle := e_{-1}\wedge e_{-2} \wedge \cdots$$,

which corresponds to the Dirac sea of states along the real integer lattice in which all negative integer locations are occupied and all non-negative ones are empty.

This is annihilated by the following operators

$$\psi_{-j}|0 \rangle = 0, \quad \psi^{\dagger}_{j-1}|0 \rangle = 0, \quad j=0, 1, \dots$$

The dual fermionic Fock space vacuum state, denoted $\langle 0 |$, is annihilated by the adjoint operators, acting to the left

$$\langle 0| \psi^\dagger_{-j} = 0, \quad  \langle 0 | \psi_{j-1}|0 = 0, \quad j=0, 1, \dots$$

Normal ordering $: L_1, \cdots L_m:$ of a product of linear operators (i.e., finite or infinite linear combinations of creation and annihilation operators) is defined so that its vacuum expectation value (VEV) vanishes

$$\langle 0 |: L_1, \cdots L_m:|0 \rangle =0.$$

In particular, for a product $L_1 L_2$ of a pair $(L_1, L_2)$ of linear operators, one has

$${:L_1 L_2:} = L_1 L_2 - \langle 0 | L_1 L_2|0 \rangle.$$

The fermionic charge operator $C$ is defined as

$$C = \sum_{i\in \mathbf{Z}} :\psi_i \psi^\dagger_i:$$

The subspace $\mathcal{F}_n \subset \mathcal{F}$ is the eigenspace of $C$ consisting of all eigenvectors with eigenvalue $n$

$$C | v; n\rangle = n | v; n\rangle, \quad \forall | v; n\rangle \in \mathcal{F}_n$$.

The standard orthonormal basis $\{|\lambda\rangle\}$ for the zero fermionic charge sector $\mathcal{F}_0$ is labelled by integer partitions $\lambda = (\lambda_1, \dots, \lambda_{\ell(\lambda)})$, where $\lambda_1\ge \cdots \ge \lambda_{\ell(\lambda)}$ is a weakly decreasing sequence of $\ell(\lambda)$ positive integers, which can equivalently be represented by a Young diagram, as depicted here for the partition $(5, 4, 1)$.

Young diagram of the partition (5, 4, 1)

An alternative notation for a partition $\lambda$ consists of the Frobenius indices $(\alpha_1, \dots \alpha_r | \beta_1, \dots \beta _r)$, where $\alpha_i$ denotes the arm length; i.e. the number $\lambda_i -i$ of boxes in the Young diagram to the right of the $i$'th diagonal box, $\beta_i$ denotes the leg length, i.e. the number of boxes in the Young diagram below the $i$'th diagonal box, for $i=1, \dots, r$, where $r$ is the Frobenius rank, which is the number of elements along the principal diagonal.

The basis element $|\lambda\rangle$ is then given by acting on the vacuum with a product of $r$ pairs of creation and annihilation operators, labelled by the Frobenius indices

$$|\lambda\rangle = (-1)^{\sum_{j=1}^r \beta_j}
\prod_{k=1}^r \big(\psi_{\alpha_k} \psi^\dagger_{-\beta_k-1}\big)| 0 \rangle.$$

The integers $\{\alpha_i\}_{i=1, \dots, r}$ indicate, relative to the Dirac sea, the occupied non-negative sites on the integer lattice while $\{-\beta_i-1\}_{i=1, \dots, r}$ indicate the unoccupied negative integer sites. The corresponding diagram, consisting of infinitely many occupied and unoccupied sites on the integer lattice that are a finite perturbation of the Dirac sea are referred to as a Maya diagram.

The case of the null (emptyset) partition $|\emptyset\rangle = |0 \rangle$ gives the vacuum state, and the dual basis $\{\langle \mu|\}$ is defined by

$$\langle \mu|\lambda\rangle = \delta_{\lambda, \mu}$$

Any KP $\tau$-function can be expressed as a sum

$\tau_w(\mathbf{t}) = \sum_{\lambda} \pi_\lambda(w) s_\lambda(\mathbf{t}),$	10

where $\mathbf{t} = (t_1, t_2, \dots, \dots)$ are the KP flow variables, $s_\lambda(\mathbf{t})$ is the Schur function corresponding to the partition $\lambda$, viewed as a function of the normalized power sum variables

$$t_i := [\mathbf{x}]_i := \frac{1}{i} \sum_{a=1}^n x_a^i \quad i = 1,2, \dots$$

in terms of an auxiliary (finite or infinite) sequence of variables $\mathbf{x}:=(x_1, \dots, x_N)$ and the constant coefficients $\pi_\lambda(w)$ may be viewed as the Plücker coordinates of an element $w\in \mathrm{Gr}_{\mathcal{H}_+}(\mathcal{H})$ of the infinite dimensional Grassmannian consisting of the orbit, under the action of the general linear group $\mathrm{Gl}(\mathcal{H})$, of the subspace $\mathcal{H}_+ = \mathrm{span}\{e_{-i}\}_{i \in \mathbf{N}} \subset \mathcal{H}$ of the Hilbert space $\mathcal{H}$.

This corresponds, under the Bose-Fermi correspondence, to a decomposable element

$$|\tau_w\rangle = \sum_{\lambda} \pi_{\lambda}(w) |\lambda \rangle$$

of the Fock space $\mathcal{F}_0$ which, up to projectivization, is the image of the Grassmannian element $w\in \mathrm{Gr}_{\mathcal{H}_+}(\mathcal{H})$ under the Plücker map

$$\mathcal{Pl}: \mathrm{span}(w_1, w_2, \dots )
\longrightarrow [w_1 \wedge w_2 \wedge \cdots ]= [|\tau_w\rangle],$$

where $(w_1, w_2, \dots )$ is a basis for the subspace $w\subset \mathcal{H}$ and $[ \cdots]$ denotes projectivization of an element of $\mathcal{F}$.

The Plücker coordinates $\{\pi_\lambda(w)\}$ satisfy an infinite set of bilinear relations, the Plücker relations, defining the image of the Plücker embedding into the projectivization $\mathbf{P}(\mathcal{F})$ of the fermionic Fock space, which are equivalent to the Hirota bilinear residue relation (1).

If $w = g(\mathcal{H}_+)$ for a group element $g \in \mathrm{Gl}(\mathcal{H})$ with fermionic representation $\hat{g}$, then the $\tau$-function $\tau_w(\mathbf{t})$ can be expressed as the fermionic vacuum state expectation value (VEV):

$$\tau_w(\mathbf{t}) = \langle 0 | \hat{\gamma}_+(\mathbf{t}) \hat{g} | 0 \rangle,$$

where

$$\Gamma_+ =\{\hat{\gamma}_+(\mathbf{t}) = e^{\sum_{i=1}^\infty t_i J_i}\}
\subset \mathrm{Gl}(\mathcal{H})$$

is the abelian subgroup of $\mathrm{Gl}(\mathcal{H})$ that generates the KP flows, and

$$J_i := \sum_{j\in \mathbf{Z}} \psi_j \psi^\dagger_{j+i}, \quad i=1,2 \dots$$

are the ""current"" components.

== Examples of solutions to the equations of the KP hierarchy ==
=== Schur functions ===
As seen in equation (9), every KP $\tau$-function can be represented (at least formally) as a linear combination of Schur functions, in which the coefficients $\pi_\lambda(w)$ satisfy the bilinear set of Plucker relations corresponding to an element $w$ of an infinite (or finite) Grassmann manifold. In fact, the simplest class of (polynomial) tau functions consists of the Schur functions $s_\lambda(\mathbf{t})$ themselves, which correspond to the special element of the Grassmann manifold whose image under the Plücker map is $|\lambda>$.

=== Multisoliton solutions ===
If we choose $3N$ complex constants $\{\alpha_k, \beta_k, \gamma_k\}_{k=1, \dots, N}$ with $\alpha_k, \beta_k$'s all distinct, $\gamma_k \ne 0$, and define the functions

$$y_k({\bf t}) := e^{\sum_{i=1}^\infty t_i \alpha_k^i} +\gamma_k e^{\sum_{i=1}^\infty t_i \beta_k^i} \quad k=1,\dots, N,$$

we arrive at the Wronskian determinant formula

$$\tau^{(N)}_{\vec\alpha, \vec\beta, \vec\gamma}({\bf t}):=
\begin{vmatrix}
y_1({\bf t})& y_2({\bf t}) &\cdots& y_N({\bf t})\\
y_1'({\bf t})& y_2'({\bf t}) &\cdots& y_N'({\bf t})\\
\vdots & \vdots &\ddots &\vdots\\
y_1^{(N-1)}({\bf t})& y_2^{(N-1)}({\bf t}) &\cdots& y_N^{(N-1)}({\bf t})\\
\end{vmatrix},$$

which gives the general $N$-soliton $\tau$-function.

=== Theta function solutions associated to algebraic curves ===
Let $X$ be a compact Riemann surface of genus $g$ and fix a canonical homology basis $a_1, \dots, a_g, b_1, \dots, b_g$ of $H_1(X,\mathbf{Z})$ with intersection numbers

$$a_i \circ a_j = b_i \circ b_j =0, \quad  a_i\circ b_j =\delta_{ij},\quad 1\leq i,j \leq g.$$

Let $\{\omega_i\}_{i=1, \dots, g}$ be a basis for the space $H^1(X)$ of holomorphic differentials satisfying the standard normalization conditions

$$\oint_{a_i} \omega_j =\delta_{ij}, \quad \oint_{b_j }\omega_j = B_{ij},$$

where $B$ is the Riemann matrix of periods. The matrix $B$ belongs to the Siegel upper half space

$$\mathbf{S}_g=\left\{B \in \mathrm{Mat}_{g\times g}(\mathbf{C})\ \colon\  B^T = B,\ \text{Im}(B)
\text{ is positive definite}\right\}.$$

The Riemann $\theta$ function on $\mathbf{C}^g$ corresponding to the period matrix $B$ is defined to be

$$\theta(Z | B) := \sum_{N\in \Z^g} e^{i\pi (N, B N) + 2i\pi (N, Z)}.$$

Choose a point $p_\infty \in X$, a local parameter $\zeta$ in a neighbourhood of $p_{\infty}$ with $\zeta(p_\infty)=0$ and a positive divisor of degree $g$

$$\mathcal{D}:= \sum_{i=1}^g p_i,\quad p_i \in X.$$

For any positive integer $k\in \mathbf{N}^+$ let $\Omega_k$ be the unique meromorphic differential of the second kind characterized by the following conditions:

- The only singularity of $\Omega_k$ is a pole of order $k+1$ at $p=p_\infty$ with vanishing residue.
- The expansion of $\Omega_k$ around $p=p_{\infty}$ is
  $$\Omega_k = d(\zeta^{-k} ) + \sum_{j=1}^\infty Q_{ij} \zeta^j d\zeta$$.
- $\Omega_k$ is normalized to have vanishing $a$-cycles:
  $$\oint_{a_i }\Omega_j =0.$$

Denote by $\mathbf{U}_k \in \mathbf{C}^g$ the vector of $b$-cycles of $\Omega_k$:

$$(\mathbf{U}_k)_j := \oint_{b_j} \Omega_k.$$

Denote the image of ${\mathcal D}$ under the Abel map $\mathcal{A}: \mathcal{S}^g(X) \to \mathbf{C}^g$

$$\mathbf{E} := \mathcal{A}(\mathcal{D}) \in \mathbf{C}^g,  \quad \mathbf{E}_j
= \mathcal{A}_j (\mathcal{D}) := \sum_{j=1}^g \int_{p_0}^{p_i}\omega_j$$

with arbitrary base point $p_0$.

Then the following is a KP $\tau$-function:

$$\tau_{(X, \mathcal{D}, p_\infty, \zeta)}(\mathbf{t}):= e^{-{1\over 2} \sum_{ij} Q_{ij}t _i t_j}
\theta\left(\mathbf{E} +\sum_{k=1}^\infty t_k \mathbf{U}_k \Big|B\right)$$.

=== Matrix model partition functions as KP $\tau$-functions ===
Let $d\mu_0(M)$ be the Lebesgue measure on the $N^2$ dimensional space ${\mathbf H}^{N\times N}$ of $N\times N$ complex Hermitian matrices. Let $\rho(M)$ be a conjugation invariant integrable density function

$$\rho(U M U^{\dagger}) = \rho(M), \quad U\in U(N).$$

Define a deformation family of measures

$$d\mu_{N,\rho}(\mathbf{t}) := e^{\text{ Tr }(\sum_{i=1}^\infty t_i M^i)} \rho(M) d\mu_0 (M)$$

for small $\mathbf{t}= (t_1, t_2, \cdots)$ and let

$$\tau_{N,\rho}({\bf t}):= \int_{{\mathbf H}^{N\times N} }d\mu_{N,\rho}({\bf t}).$$

be the partition function for this random matrix model. Then $\tau_{N,\rho}(\mathbf{t})$ satisfies the bilinear Hirota residue equation (1), and hence is a $\tau$-function of the KP hierarchy.

=== $\tau$-functions of hypergeometric type. Generating function for Hurwitz numbers ===
Let $\{r_i\}_{i\in \mathbf{Z}}$ be a (doubly) infinite sequence of complex numbers. For any integer partition $\lambda = (\lambda_1, \dots, \lambda_{\ell(\lambda)})$ define the content product coefficient

$$r_{\lambda} := \prod_{(i,j)\in \lambda} r_{j-i}$$,

where the product is over all pairs $(i,j)$ of positive integers that correspond to boxes of the Young diagram of the partition $\lambda$, viewed as positions of matrix elements of the corresponding $\ell(\lambda) \times \lambda_1$ matrix. Then, for every pair of infinite sequences $\mathbf{t} = (t_1, t_2, \dots )$ and $\mathbf{s} = (s_1, s_2, \dots )$ of complex variables, viewed as (normalized) power sums $\mathbf{t} = [\mathbf{x}], \ \mathbf{s} = [\mathbf{y}]$ of the infinite sequence of auxiliary variables

$\mathbf{x} = (x_1, x_2, \dots )$ and $\mathbf{y} = (y_1, y_2, \dots )$,

defined by:

$$t_j := \tfrac{1}{j}\sum_{a=1}^\infty x_a^j, \quad s_j := \tfrac{1}{j} \sum_{j=1}^\infty y_a^j$$,

the function

$\tau^r(\mathbf{t},\mathbf{s}) := \sum_{\lambda}r_\lambda s_\lambda(\mathbf{t})s_\lambda(\mathbf{s})$	11

is a double KP $\tau$-function, both in the $\mathbf{t}$ and the $\mathbf{s}$ variables, known as a $\tau$-function of hypergeometric type.

In particular, choosing

$$r_j = r^{\beta}_j := e^{j\beta}$$

for some small parameter $\beta$, denoting the corresponding content product coefficient as $r_\lambda^\beta$ and setting

$$\mathbf{s} = (1, 0, \dots)=: \mathbf{t}_0$$,

the resulting $\tau$-function can be equivalently expanded as

$\tau^{r^\beta}(\mathbf{t},\mathbf{t}_0) = \sum_{\lambda}\sum_{d=0}^\infty \frac{\beta^d}{d!} H_d(\lambda)p_\lambda(\mathbf{t}),$	12

where $\{H_d(\lambda)\}$ are the simple Hurwitz numbers, which are $\frac{1}{n!}$ times the number of ways in which an element $k_\lambda \in \mathcal{S}_{n}$ of the symmetric group $\mathcal{S}_{n}$ in $n=|\lambda|$ elements, with cycle lengths equal to the parts of the partition $\lambda$, can be factorized as a product of $d$ $2$-cycles

$$k_\lambda = (a_1 b_1)\dots (a_d b_d)$$,

and

$$p_{\lambda}(\mathbf{t}) = \prod_{i=1}^{\ell(\lambda)} p_{\lambda_i}(\mathbf{t}), \ \text{with}\ p_i(\mathbf{t}) := \sum_{a=1}^\infty x^i_a = i t_i$$

is the power sum symmetric function. Equation (12) thus shows that the (formal) KP hypergeometric $\tau$-function (11) corresponding to the content product coefficients $r_\lambda^\beta$ is a generating function, in the combinatorial sense, for simple Hurwitz numbers.

== Bibliography ==
- Dickey, L.A. (2003), Soliton Equations and Hamiltonian Systems, Advanced Series in Mathematical Physics, vol. 26, World Scientific Publishing Co., Inc., River Edge, NJ, 2nd Ed., doi:10.1142/5108, ISBN 9789810202156
- Harnad, J.; Balogh, F. (2021), Tau functions and Their Applications, Cambridge Monographs on Mathematical Physics, Cambridge, U.K.: Cambridge University Press, doi:10.1017/9781108610902, ISBN 9781108610902, S2CID 222379146
- Hirota, R. (2004), Nagai, Atsushi; Nimmo, Jon; Gilson, Claire (eds.), The Direct Method in Soliton Theory, Cambridge Tracts in Mathematics, vol. 155, Cambridge, U.K.: Cambridge University Press, doi:10.1017/CBO9780511543043, ISBN 9780511543043
- Jimbo, M.; Miwa, T. (1999), Solitons: Differential Equations, Symmetries and Infinite Dimensional Algebras, Cambridge Tracts in Mathematics, vol. 135, Cambridge, U.K.: Cambridge University Press, ISBN 9780521561617
- Kodama, Y. (2017), KP Solitons and the Grassmannians: Combinatorics and Geometry of Two-Dimensional Wave Patterns, Springer Briefs in Mathematical Physics, vol. 22, Bibcode:2017ksgc.book.....K, doi:10.1007/978-981-10-4094-8, ISBN 978-981-10-4094-8
