= Andrei Bolibrukh =

Soviet and Russian mathematician (1950–2003)

- Born: 30 January 1950; Moscow, USSR
- Died: 11 November 2003 (aged 53); Paris, France
- Citizenship: USSR, Russia
- Education: Lomonosov Moscow State University
- Known for: Hilbert's twenty-first problem
- Awards: State Prize of the Russian Federation (2001)
- Scientific career
- Fields: Riemann–Hilbert problem, Monodromy
- Workplaces: Steklov Institute of Mathematics, Moscow Institute of Physics and Technology
- Doctoral advisor: Mikhail Postnikov; Alexey Chernavskii

Andrei Andreevich Bolibrukh (Russian: Андрей Андреевич Болибрух) (30 January 1950 – 11 November 2003) was a Soviet and Russian mathematician. He was known for his work on ordinary differential equations especially Hilbert's twenty-first problem (Riemann–Hilbert problem). Bolibrukh was the author of about a hundred research articles on theory of ordinary differential equations including Riemann–Hilbert problem and Fuchsian system.

== Work ==
Bolibrukh was born on 30 January 1950 in Moscow and studied at the 45th Physics-Mathematics School in Saint Petersburg. After receiving his mathematical education at the Lomonosov Moscow State University, with Mikhail Mikhailovich Postnikov and Alexey Chernavskii as thesis advisers, he started working on the proof of the existence of linear differential equations having a prescribed monodromic group. He applied modern methods of complex analytic geometry to classical problems about ordinary differential equations and was an expert on Hilbert's twenty-first problem. In 1989, Bolibrukh produced his famous counterexamples which invalidated the Josip Plemelj's 1908 solution of Hilbert's twenty-first problem. Bolibrukh dedicated much of his efforts to the Riemann-Hilbert problem in order to find full necessary and sufficient conditions for given monodromy data to be those of a Fuchsian system.

During his short career he served as Deputy Director of the Steklov Institute of Mathematics and professor at the Moscow Institute of Physics and Technology.

== Honours and awards ==
In 1994 Bolibrukh was elected to the Russian Academy of Sciences. He was an Invited Speaker at the ICM in Zürich in 1994. He was awarded the Lyapunov Prize from the Academy of Sciences, Russia in 1995. In 2001 Bolibrukh received the State Prize of the Russian Federation.
