= Hiroshi Umemura =

Hiroshi Umemura may refer to:

- Hiroshi Umemura (fighter)
- Hiroshi Umemura (mathematician)
