= Edward Goldman =

Edward Goldman may refer to:

- Edward Alphonso Goldman (1873–1946), American zoologist
- Edward Goldman (professor), Talmudic scholar
- Eddie Goldman (born 1994), American football player
- Edward Goldman, art critic, contributor to KCRW
