= Hildegard Lewy =

Hildegard Lewy (née Schlesinger; 17 November 1903 – 8 October 1969) was an Assyriologist and academic. Having originally trained as a physicist, upon her marriage to Julius Lewy she moved into Assyriology; she specialised in cuneiform texts and Babylonian mathematics. She translated, commented on, and published a number of texts from Nuzi and Mari. She also contributed two chapters to The Cambridge Ancient History. She was a professor of Assyriology at the Hebrew Union College-Jewish Institute of Religion.

Born in Cluj-Napoca, Transylvania, Lewy was the daughter of Ludwig Schlesinger, a mathematician. She studied at the University of Giessen, and completed a doctorate in physics in 1926.

== Selected works ==
- Lewy, Hildegard; Lewy, Julius (1942). "The origin of the week and the oldest west Asiatic calendar". Hebrew Union College Annual. 17: 1–152c. ISSN 0360-9049. JSTOR 23506437.
- Lewy, Hildegard (1949). "Studies in Assyro-Babylonian Mathematics and Metrology". Orientalia. 18 (1): 40–67. ISSN 0030-5367. JSTOR 43072613.
- Lewy, Hildegard (1971). "CHAPTER XXIV(b) - ANATOLIA IN THE OLD ASSYRIAN PERIOD". In I. E. S., Edwards; C. J., Gadd; N. G. L., Hammond (eds.). The Cambridge Ancient History: Volume 1, Part 2: Early History of the Middle East. Cambridge: Cambridge University Press.
- Lewy, Hildegard (1971). "CHAPTER XXV - ASSYRIA, c. 2600–1816 B.C.". In I. E. S., Edwards; C. J., Gadd; N. G. L., Hammond (eds.). The Cambridge Ancient History: Volume 1, Part 2: Early History of the Middle East. Cambridge: Cambridge University Press.
- Lewy, Hildegard (1968). "Old Assyrian Texts in the University Museum Philadelphia". Hebrew Union College Annual. 39: 1–33.
- Lewy, Hildegard (1968). "A Contribution to the Historical Geography of the Nuzi Texts". Journal of the American Oriental Society. 88 (1): 150–162. doi:10.2307/597909. ISSN 0003-0279. JSTOR 597909.
- Lewy, Hildegard (1969–1970). "Old Assyrian Texts in the University Museum Philadelphia". Hebrew Union College Annual. 40–41: 45–85.
