= Arno Kuijlaars =

Dutch mathematician (born 1963)

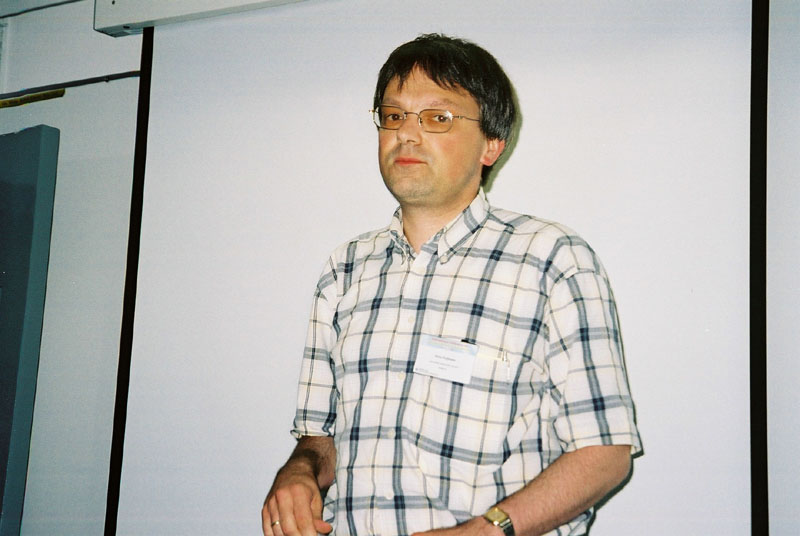
Kuijlaars at KU Leuven

Arnoldus Bernardus Jacobus Kuijlaars (born 1963) is a Dutch mathematician, specializing in approximation theory.

Kuijlaars completed his undergraduate studies at the Eindhoven University of Technology and received in 1991 his Ph.D. from Utrecht University with thesis Approximation of Metric Spaces with Applications in Potential Theory. Currently he is a professor at the Katholieke Universiteit Leuven.

In 1998 Kuijlaars won the triennially awarded Popov prize. In 2010 he was an invited speaker at the International Congress of Mathematicians at Hyderabad. In 2011 he was elected a corresponding member of the KNAW. In 2013 he was elected a fellow of the American Mathematical Society.

== Selected publications ==
- Kuijlaars, Arno (1995). "Chebyshev-type quadrature and partial sums of the exponential series". Math. Comp. 64 (209): 251–263. doi:10.1090/s0025-5718-1995-1250771-6. MR 1250771.
- Kuijlaars, Arno B. J. (1996). "The zeros of Faber polynomials generated by an m-star". Math. Comp. 65 (213): 151–156. doi:10.1090/s0025-5718-96-00684-9. MR 1325869.
- with E. B. Saff: Kuijlaars, A. B. J.; Saff, E. B. (1998). "Asymptotics for minimal discrete energy on the sphere". Trans. Amer. Math. Soc. 350 (2): 523–538. doi:10.1090/s0002-9947-98-02119-9. MR 1458327.
- with P. D. Dragner: Kuijlaars, A. B. J.; Dragnev, P. D. (1999). "Equilibrium problems associated with fast decreasing polynomials". Proc. Amer. Math. Soc. 127 (4): 1065–1074. doi:10.1090/S0002-9939-99-04590-6. MR 1469419.
- with S. B. Damelin: Damelin, S. B.; Kuijlaars, A. B. J. (1999). "The support of the equilibrium measure in the presence of a monomial external field on [–1,1]". Trans. Amer. Math. Soc. 351 (11): 4561–4584. doi:10.1090/s0002-9947-99-02509-x. MR 1675178.
- Erik Koelink; Walter Van Assche, eds. (2003). "Riemann-Hilbert analysis for orthogonal polynomials by Arno B. J. Kuijlaars". Orthogonal Polynomials and Special Functions: Leuven 2002. Springer. p. 167. ISBN 9783540403753.
- with Maurice Duits and Man Yue Mo: The Hermitian Two Matrix Model with an Even Quartic Potential. American Mathematical Society. 2012. ISBN 9780821869284.

== See also ==
- Fekete problem
- Riemann–Hilbert problem
