= Birkhoff decomposition =

Birkhoff decomposition refers to two different mathematical concepts:

- The Birkhoff factorization, introduced by George David Birkhoff at 1909, is the presentation of an invertible matrix with polynomial coefficients as a product of three matrices.
- The Birkhoff - von Neumann decomposition, introduced by Garrett Birkhoff (George's son) at 1946, is the presentation of a bistochastic matrix as a convex sum of permutation matrices. It can be found by the Birkhoff algorithm.
