= Ludwig Schlesinger =

German mathematician (1864–1933)

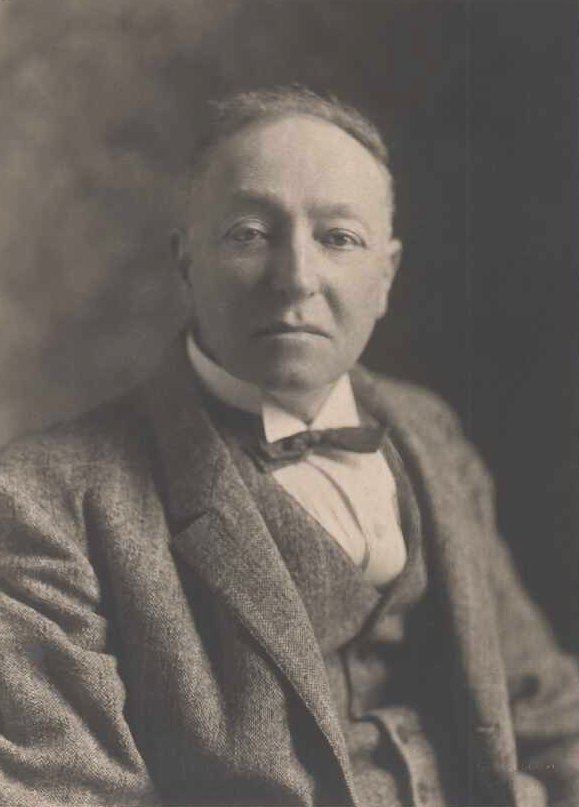
- Born: 1 November 1864; Tyrnau, Hungary
- Died: 15 December 1933 (aged 69); Giessen, Hesse
- Other name: Lajos Schlesinger

Ludwig Schlesinger (Hungarian: Schlesinger Lajos, Slovak: Ľudovít Schlesinger), (1 November 1864 – 15 December 1933) was a German mathematician known for the research in the field of linear differential equations.

== Biography ==
Schlesinger attended the high school in Pressburg and later studied physics and mathematics in Heidelberg and Berlin. In 1887 he received his PhD (Über lineare homogene Differentialgleichungen vierter Ordnung, zwischen deren Integralen homogene Relationen höheren als ersten Grades bestehen.) His thesis advisors were Lazarus Immanuel Fuchs and Leopold Kronecker. In 1889 he became an associate professor at Berlin; in 1897 an invited professor in Bonn and in the same year, a full professor at the University of Kolozsvár, Hungary (now Cluj, Romania). From 1911 he was professor at the University of Giessen, where he taught until 1930. His daughter Hildegard Lewy (1903–1969), became an Assyriologist and academic. In 1933 he was forced to retire by the Nazis. He died shortly afterwards. His doctoral students include Abraham Plessner.

Schlesinger was a historian of science. He wrote an article on the function theory of Carl Friedrich Gauss and translated René Descartes' La Géométrie into German (1894). He was one of the organizers of the celebrations for the hundredth anniversary of János Bolyai and from 1904 to 1909 with R. Fuchs he collected the works of his teacher Lazarus Fuchs, who was also his father-in-law. In 1902 he became a corresponding member of the Hungarian Academy of Sciences. In 1909 he received the Lobachevsky Prize.

From 1929 until his death he was co-editor of Crelle's Journal.

Like his teacher Fuchs, he worked primarily on linear ordinary differential equations. His two-volume Handbuch der Theorie der Linearen Differentialgleichungen was published from 1895 to 1898 in Teubner in Leipzig (Vol.2 in two parts). He also published Einführung in die Theorie der gewöhnlichen Differentialgleichungen auf funktionentheoretischer Grundlage (Auflage, 1922), Vorlesungen über lineare Differentialgleichungen (1908) and Automorphe Funktionen (Gruyter, 1924). In 1909 he wrote a long report for the annual report of the German Mathematical Society on the history of linear differential equations since 1865. He also studied differential geometry, and wrote a book of lectures on Albert Einstein's general relativity theory.

Today, his best known work is Über eine Klasse von Differentialsystemen beliebiger Ordnung mit festen kritischen Punkten (Crelle's Journal, 1912). There he considered the problem of isomonodromy deformations for a certain matrix Fuchsian equation; this is a special case of Hilbert's 21st Problem (existence of differential equations with prescribed monodromy). The paper introduced what are today called Schlesinger transformations and Schlesinger equations.
