= Abraham Plessner =

Russian-Jewish mathematician

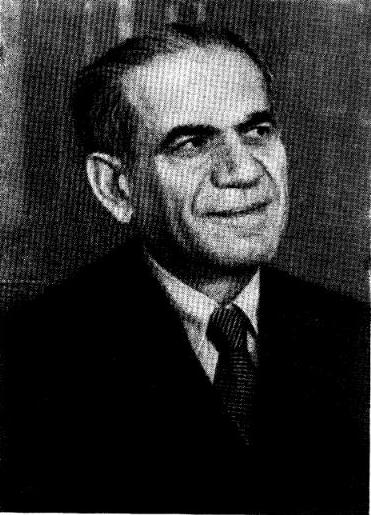
- Abraham Plessner, c. 1950
- Born: February 13, 1900; Łódź, Poland
- Died: April 18, 1961 (aged 61); Moscow, Soviet Union
- Education: University of Giessen
- Scientific career
- Fields: Mathematics
- Workplaces: Moscow State University
- Doctoral advisor: Ludwig Schlesinger

Abraham Plessner (February 13, 1900 – April 18, 1961) was a Russian mathematician. He was born on February 13, 1900, to a Jewish family in Łódź, which is now in Poland. He studied at secondary school where he was taught in Russian, German, and Polish. He studied at the University of Giessen where he studied under Ludwig Schlesinger and Friedrich Engel. He also studied at the University of Göttingen and Berlin. He completed his doctorate from the University of Giessen in 1922. Jointly with Kurt Hensel he edited Kronecker's collected works.

After completing his doctorate, Plessner worked in Marburg where he published a paper containing what is now called Plessner's theorem. It is a theorem concerning the boundary behaviour of functions meromorphic in the unit disk.

Plessner submitted his habilitation, the extra post-doctoral qualification needed to lecture at a German university, to the faculty at the University of Giessen. He was denied because he happened to be a Russian citizen. He then moved to Moscow and joined the research group of Nikolai Nikolaevich Luzin at Moscow State University. Though he left Germany before the Nazi's seized power in 1933, some scholars consider him an early Jewish emigrant from Nazi Germany; his career was negatively impacted by antisemitism and he was not able to return to Germany, unlike early non-Jewish emigrants such as Eberhard Hopf and Wilhelm Maier. One scholar writes that in Plessner's case "the anti-Semitic prejudice was mixed with and partly hidden by concern for their lack of a German citizenship".

In 1939, he became a professor at Moscow State University. He also held a position at the Mathematical Institute of the USSR Academy of Sciences. In 1949, he was dismissed from both posts during the Soviet campaign against "rootless cosmopolitans".

Plessner is widely viewed as a founder of the Moscow school of functional analysis. He faced financial and health problems in his later years. He died on April 18, 1961, in Moscow.
