= Inverse scattering problem =

Problem in applied mathematics

In mathematics and physics, the inverse scattering problem is the problem of determining characteristics of an object, based on data of how it scatters incoming radiation or particles. It is the inverse problem to the direct scattering problem, which is to determine how radiation or particles are scattered based on the properties of the scatterer.

Soliton equations are a class of partial differential equations which can be studied and solved by a method called the inverse scattering transform, which reduces the nonlinear PDEs to a linear inverse scattering problem. The nonlinear Schrödinger equation, the Korteweg–de Vries equation and the KP equation are examples of soliton equations. In one space dimension the inverse scattering problem is equivalent to a Riemann-Hilbert problem. Inverse scattering has been applied to many problems including radiolocation, echolocation, geophysical survey, nondestructive testing, medical imaging, and quantum field theory.
