= Hilbert's twenty-first problem =

On linear differential equations with certain properties

The twenty-first problem of the 23 Hilbert problems, from the celebrated list put forth in 1900 by David Hilbert, concerns the existence of a certain class of linear differential equations with specified singular points and monodromic group.

== Statement ==
The original problem was stated as follows (English translation from 1902):

Proof of the existence of linear differential equations having a prescribed monodromic group

In the theory of linear differential equations with one independent variable z, I wish to indicate an important problem one which very likely Riemann himself may have had in mind. This problem is as follows: To show that there always exists a linear differential equation of the Fuchsian class, with given singular points and monodromic group. The problem requires the production of n functions of the variable z, regular throughout the complex z-plane except at the given singular points; at these points the functions may become infinite of only finite order, and when z describes circuits about these points the functions shall undergo the prescribed linear substitutions. The existence of such differential equations has been shown to be probable by counting the constants, but the rigorous proof has been obtained up to this time only in the particular case where the fundamental equations of the given substitutions have roots all of absolute magnitude unity. L. Schlesinger (1895) has given this proof, based upon Poincaré's theory of the Fuchsian zeta-functions. The theory of linear differential equations would evidently have a more finished appearance if the problem here sketched could be disposed of by some perfectly general method.

== Definitions ==
A common modern formulation uses linear systems of differential equations: in order to realise any monodromy by a scalar differential equation one has to admit, in general, the presence of additional apparent singularities, i.e. singularities with trivial local monodromy. In more modern language, the (systems of) differential equations in question are those defined in the complex plane, less a few points, and with a regular singularity at those. For scalar linear differential equations, regular and Fuchsian singularities are equivalent, but this is no longer true for systems. A stricter version of the problem requires these singularities to be Fuchsian, i.e. poles of first order (logarithmic poles), including at infinity. A monodromy group is prescribed, by means of a finite-dimensional complex representation of the fundamental group of the complement in the Riemann sphere of those points, plus the point at infinity, up to equivalence. The fundamental group is actually a free group, on 'circuits' going once round each missing point, starting and ending at a given base point. The question is whether the mapping from these Fuchsian systems to classes of representations is surjective.

== History ==
It led to several bijective correspondences known as 'Riemann–Hilbert correspondences', for flat algebraic connections with regular singularities and more generally regular holonomic D-modules or flat algebraic connections with regular singularities on principal G-bundles, in all dimensions. The history of proofs involving a single complex variable is complicated. Josip Plemelj published a solution in 1908. This work was for a long time accepted as a definitive solution; there was work of G. D. Birkhoff in 1913 also. Plemelj (1964) wrote a monograph summing up his work. In fact, Plemelj correctly proved that any prescribed monodromy can be realised by a regular linear system which is Fuchsian at all but possibly one of the singular points. The gap in his argument for making the remaining point Fuchsian was identified independently by Yuliy S. Il'yashenko and Armando Treibich Kohn in the early 1980s. Treibich Kohn showed that Plemelj's conclusion does hold when the corresponding monodromy matrix is diagonalizable.

In 1989, Andrey Bolibrukh constructed a counterexample showing that Plemelj's stronger claim is false in general. His result gives a negative answer to Hilbert's twenty-first problem in the Fuchsian-system formulation: for a given pole configuration certain monodromy groups can be realised by regular, but not by Fuchsian systems.

The relation between this result and Hilbert's original wording requires some qualification. Hilbert spoke of a linear differential equation, rather than a system, and described the behaviour of its solutions at the prescribed singular points by a finite-order growth condition, corresponding in modern terminology to regular singularities. For scalar linear differential equations regular and Fuchsian singularities are equivalent, but for systems they are not. Moreover, the scalar Fuchsian version was already known to have a negative answer in general unless additional apparent singularities were allowed. Bothner therefore distinguishes at least three interpretations of Hilbert's formulation:

- realization by a scalar Fuchsian differential equation with only the prescribed singularities, which has a negative answer in general unless additional apparent singularities are allowed (Poincaré (1884));
- realization by a linear system having only regular singularities, which was solved positively by Plemelj in 1908; and
- realization by a Fuchsian system on the Riemann sphere, which has a negative answer in general by Bolibrukh's counterexample.

In 1979 Dekkers showed that the Fuchsian-system problem is always solvable for systems of rank 2. Andrey A. Bolibrukh (1990) subsequently gave a detailed study of the rank-3 case, describing when counterexamples occur. Bolibrukh (1992) and independently Vladimir Kostov (1992) showed that, in arbitrary rank, every irreducible monodromy representation can be realised by a Fuchsian system.

Kostov further studied the locus of monodromy data for which the Fuchsian-system problem is not solvable. For $p+1$ prescribed poles, he showed that its codimension in $(GL(n,\mathbb C))^p$ is $2p(n-1)$ when $n=3$ or $n\geq 7$ (Vladimir Kostov (1992)). Anosov & Bolibruch (1994) further developed sufficient conditions for positive solvability for reducible monodromy representations, including criteria involving their block-triangular structure.

These different formulations are also reflected in the literature. Helmut Röhrl (1957) treated the Riemann–Hilbert problem in one complex dimension. Parallel developments in algebraic geometry led to a broader formulation in terms of integrable algebraic connections. Pierre Deligne (1970) established the corresponding Riemann–Hilbert theory for algebraic connections with regular singularities. Katz (1976) later discussed Deligne's work explicitly under the title Hilbert's Twenty-First Problem, illustrating the established use of that name for the regular-singular formulation.

== See also ==
- Isomonodromic deformation
