= Edward Goldman (professor) =

Edward A. Goldman is a Talmudic scholar. He is Professor Emeritus Israel and Ida Bettan Chair in Midrash and Homiletics at the Hebrew Union College. He is the editor of the Hebrew Union College Annual.

Goldman studied at Harvard College, the Hebrew University of Jerusalem and the Hebrew Union College.
