= Hiroshi Umemura (mathematician) =

Japanese mathematician (1944–2019)

- 梅村 浩
- Born: 1944; Nagoya, Aichi prefecture, Japan
- Died: March 8, 2019 (aged 74–75)
- Education: Nagoya University
- Scientific career
- Fields: Algebraic geometry; Differential equations
- Workplaces: Strasbourg University; Nagoya University

Hiroshi Umemura (梅村 浩; 1944 – March 8, 2019) was a Japanese mathematician and professor at Nagoya University in the field of algebraic geometry and differential equations.

== Biography ==
Umemura was born in Nagoya in 1944. He graduated from Nagoya University in 1967.

At the beginning of his career, Umemura studied the subgroups of the Cremona group. In the 1980s, while visiting the University of Strasbourg, he began studying Painlevé equations, particularly Galois theory.

In 1996, Umemura wrote his first of multiple papers on Galois theory, which was influential in the community surrounding Painlevé equations in Japan.

Umemura died on March 8, 2019. At the time, he had been working on an article titled Toward Quantization of Galois Theory with fellow mathematicians Akira Masuoka and Katsunori Saito. The article was published posthumously in 2020.
