= Nick Woodhouse =

British mathematician (born 1949)

The Honourable Nicholas Michael John Woodhouse CBE (born 27 February 1949) is a British mathematician. He is Emeritus Fellow of Wadham College, University of Oxford and former President of the Clay Mathematics Institute.

== Education and early life ==
Woodhouse is the younger son and second child of Christopher Montague Woodhouse, 5th Baron Terrington, and Lady Davidema (Davina) Bulwer-Lytton. He was educated at Winchester College, then the University of Oxford and King's College London. He completed his undergraduate degree in Mathematics at Christ Church, Oxford in 1970 and PhD at the University of London, King's College in 1973, where he subsequently held an SRC Fellowship. In 1973, he also held a Procter Visiting Fellowship at Princeton University.

== Career ==
He was Research Associate in the Department of Physics, Princeton University (1975-1976) and a Junior Lecturer, University of Oxford (1976-1977). In 1977, he was made a Fellow of Wadham College, University of Oxford, where he has been an Emeritus Fellow since 1988. He was Head of the Mathematical Institute, University of Oxford (2001-2009). He served as Treasurer of the London Mathematical Society (2002-2009) and President of the Clay Mathematics Institute (2012-2018).

His research is in applications of geometry in mathematical physics.

== Honours ==
Woodhouse was appointed Commander of the Order of the British Empire (CBE) in the 2020 New Year Honours for services to mathematics.

== Bibliography ==
- Lectures on Geometric Quantization, with D J Simms, Lecture Notes in Physics, Springer, 1976
- Introduction to Analytical Dynamics, OUP, 1987; Springer, 2010
- Geometric Quantization, OUP, 1980 (2nd edition 1997)
- Special Relativity, Lecture Notes in Physics, Monographs, Springer, 1992
- Integrability, Self-Duality, and Twistor Theory, with L.J. Mason, OUP/LMS, 1995
- Special Relativity, Springer, 2004
- General Relativity, Springer, 2007
