= Loop algebra =

Type of Lie algebra of interest in physics

In mathematics, loop algebras are certain types of Lie algebras, of particular interest in theoretical physics.

== Definition ==
For a Lie algebra $\mathfrak{g}$ over a field $K$, if $K[t,t^{-1}]$ is the space of Laurent polynomials, then
$$L\mathfrak{g} := \mathfrak{g}\otimes K[t,t^{-1}],$$
with the inherited bracket
$$[X\otimes t^m, Y\otimes t^n] = [X,Y]\otimes t^{m+n}.$$

=== Geometric definition ===
If $\mathfrak{g}$ is a Lie algebra, the tensor product of $\mathfrak{g}$ with C^{∞}(S^{1}), the algebra of (complex) smooth functions over the circle manifold S^{1} (equivalently, smooth complex-valued periodic functions of a given period),

$$\mathfrak{g}\otimes C^\infty(S^1),$$

is an infinite-dimensional Lie algebra with the Lie bracket given by

$$[g_1\otimes f_1,g_2 \otimes f_2]=[g_1,g_2]\otimes f_1 f_2.$$

Here g_{1} and g_{2} are elements of $\mathfrak{g}$ and f_{1} and f_{2} are elements of C^{∞}(S^{1}).

This isn't precisely what would correspond to the direct product of infinitely many copies of $\mathfrak{g}$, one for each point in S^{1}, because of the smoothness restriction. Instead, it can be thought of in terms of smooth map from S^{1} to $\mathfrak{g}$; a smooth parametrized loop in $\mathfrak{g}$, in other words. This is why it is called the loop algebra.

== Gradation ==
Defining $\mathfrak{g}_i$ to be the linear subspace $\mathfrak{g}_i = \mathfrak{g}\otimes t^i < L\mathfrak{g},$ the bracket restricts to a product
$$[\cdot\, , \, \cdot]: \mathfrak{g}_i \times \mathfrak{g}_j \rightarrow \mathfrak{g}_{i+j},$$
hence giving the loop algebra a $\mathbb{Z}$-graded Lie algebra structure.

In particular, the bracket restricts to the 'zero-mode' subalgebra $\mathfrak{g}_0 \cong \mathfrak{g}$.

== Derivation ==
There is a natural derivation on the loop algebra, conventionally denoted $d$ acting as
$$d: L\mathfrak{g} \rightarrow L\mathfrak{g}$$
$$d(X\otimes t^n) = nX\otimes t^n$$
and so can be thought of formally as $d = t\frac{d}{dt}$.

It is required to define affine Lie algebras, which are used in physics, particularly conformal field theory.

== Loop group ==
Similarly, a set of all smooth maps from S^{1} to a Lie group G forms an infinite-dimensional Lie group (Lie group in the sense we can define functional derivatives over it) called the loop group. The Lie algebra of a loop group is the corresponding loop algebra.

== Affine Lie algebras as central extension of loop algebras ==
If $\mathfrak{g}$ is a semisimple Lie algebra, then a nontrivial central extension of its loop algebra $L\mathfrak g$ gives rise to an affine Lie algebra. Furthermore, this central extension is unique.

The central extension is given by adjoining a central element $\hat k$, that is, for all $X\otimes t^n \in L\mathfrak{g}$,
$$[\hat k, X\otimes t^n] = 0,$$
and modifying the bracket on the loop algebra to
$$[X\otimes t^m, Y\otimes t^n] = [X,Y] \otimes t^{m + n} + mB(X,Y) \delta_{m+n,0} \hat k,$$
where $B(\cdot, \cdot)$ is the Killing form.

The central extension is, as a vector space, $L\mathfrak{g} \oplus \mathbb{C}\hat k$ (in its usual definition, as more generally, $\mathbb{C}$ can be taken to be an arbitrary field).

=== Cocycle ===
Using the language of Lie algebra cohomology, the central extension can be described using a 2-cocycle on the loop algebra. This is the map
$$\varphi: L\mathfrak g \times L\mathfrak g \rightarrow \mathbb{C}$$
satisfying
$$\varphi(X\otimes t^m, Y\otimes t^n) = mB(X,Y)\delta_{m+n,0}.$$
Then the extra term added to the bracket is $\varphi(X\otimes t^m, Y\otimes t^n)\hat k.$

=== Affine Lie algebra ===
In physics, the central extension $L\mathfrak g \oplus \mathbb C \hat k$ is sometimes referred to as the affine Lie algebra. In mathematics, this is insufficient, and the full affine Lie algebra is the vector space
$$\hat \mathfrak{g} = L\mathfrak{g} \oplus \mathbb C \hat k \oplus \mathbb C d$$
where $d$ is the derivation defined above.

On this space, the Killing form can be extended to a non-degenerate form, and so allows a root system analysis of the affine Lie algebra.
