= Equivariant K-theory =

In mathematics, equivariant K-theory refers to either

- equivariant algebraic K-theory, an equivariant analog of algebraic K-theory
- equivariant topological K-theory, an equivariant analog of topological K-theory
