= Hebrew Union College Annual =

- Discipline: Jewish studies
- Language: English, Hebrew
- Edited by: Edward Goldman

Publication details
- History: 1924-present
- Publisher: Hebrew Union College
- Frequency: Annually

Standard abbreviations
- ISO 4: Hebr. Union Coll. Annu.

Indexing
- ISSN: 0360-9049
- LCCN: 25012620
- JSTOR: 03609049
- OCLC no.: 781537659

Links
- Journal homepage; Online contents and abstracts

The Hebrew Union College Annual (HUCA) is an annual peer-reviewed academic journal in the field of Jewish studies. It was established in 1924 and is published by the Hebrew Union College. The editors-in-chief are David H. Aaron and Jason Kalman.
