= Painlevé transcendents =

Special functions in mathematics

In mathematics, Painlevé transcendents are solutions to certain nonlinear second-order ordinary differential equations in the complex plane with the Painlevé property (the only movable singularities are poles), but which are not generally solvable in terms of elementary functions. They were discovered by Émile Picard (1889), Paul Painlevé (1900, 1902), Richard Fuchs (1905), and Bertrand Gambier (1910).

== History ==
=== Origins ===
Painlevé transcendents have their origin in the study of special functions, which often arise as solutions of differential equations, as well as in the study of isomonodromic deformations of linear differential equations. One of the most useful classes of special functions are the elliptic functions. They are defined by second-order ordinary differential equations whose singularities have the Painlevé property: the only movable singularities are poles. This property is rare in nonlinear equations.

Poincaré and Lazarus Fuchs showed that any first order equation (that is, an ODE involving only up to the first derivative) with the Painlevé property can be transformed into the Weierstrass elliptic equation or the Riccati equation, all of which can be solved explicitly in terms of integration and previously known special functions.

Émile Picard pointed out that for orders greater than 1, movable essential singularities can occur, and found in Picard (1889) a special case of what was later called Painleve VI equation (see below). (For orders greater than 2 the solutions can have moving natural boundaries.) Specifically, let $\varphi$ be the elliptic function defined by
$$\varphi: y \mapsto \varphi(y, x), \qquad y=\int_{\infty}^{\varphi} \frac{\mathrm{d} z}{\sqrt{z(z-1)(z-x)}}$$
and let $\omega_1(x), \omega_2(x)$ be its two half-periods. Then the function
$$u: x \mapsto u(x)=\varphi\left(2 c_1 \omega_1(x)+2 c_2 \omega_2(x), x\right)$$
with $\left(c_1, c_2\right)$ arbitrary constants satisfies the Painleve VI equation in the case of $\alpha=\beta=\gamma= \delta - 1/2 = 0$.

=== Classification ===
Around 1900, Paul Painlevé studied second-order differential equations with no movable singularities. He found that up to certain transformations, every such equation of the form

$$y^{\prime\prime}=R(y^{\prime},y,t)$$

(with $R$ a rational function) can be put into one of 50 canonical forms (listed in (Ince 1956)).

Painlevé (1900, 1902) found that 44 of the 50 equations are reducible, in the sense that they can be solved in terms of previously known functions, leaving just 6 equations requiring the introduction of new special functions to solve them. These six second order nonlinear differential equations are called the Painlevé equations and their solutions are called the Painlevé transcendents. There were some computational errors, and as a result he missed 3 of the equations, including the general form of Painleve VI. Painlevé's student Bertrand Gambier fixed the errors and completed the classification.

Independently of Painlevé and Gambier, equation Painleve VI was found by Richard Fuchs from completely different considerations: he studied isomonodromic deformations of linear differential equations with regular singularities.

The most general form of the sixth equation was missed by Painlevé, but was discovered in 1905 by Richard Fuchs (son of Lazarus Fuchs), as the differential equation satisfied by the singularity of a second order Fuchsian equation with 4 regular singular points on the projective line $\mathbf{P}^1$ under monodromy-preserving deformations. It was added to Painlevé's list by Gambier (1910).

=== Subsequent work ===
Chazy (1910, 1911) tried to extend Painlevé's work to higher-order equations, finding some third-order equations with the Painlevé property.

It was an open problem for many years to show that these 6 equations really were irreducible for generic values of the parameters (they are sometimes reducible for special parameter values; see below), but this was finally proved by Nishioka (1988) and Hiroshi Umemura (1989).

== List of Painlevé equations ==

These six equations, traditionally called Painlevé I–VI, are as follows:

- I (Painlevé):
  $$\frac{d^2y}{dt^2} = 6 y^2 +  t$$
- II (Painlevé):
  $$\frac{d^2y}{dt^2} = 2 y^3 + ty + \alpha$$
- III (Painlevé):
  $$\frac{d^2y}{dt^2} =
\frac{1}{y}\left(\frac{dy}{dt}\right)^2-\frac{1}{t}\frac{dy}{dt} + \frac{1}{t}(\alpha y^2 + \beta) + \gamma y^3 + \frac{\delta}{y}$$
- IV (Gambier):
  $$\frac{d^2y}{dt^2}=\frac{1}{2y}\left(\frac{dy}{dt}\right)^2+\tfrac32y^3+4ty^2+2(t^2-\alpha)y+\frac{\beta}{y}$$
- V (Gambier):
  $$\begin{align}
\frac{d^2y}{dt^2}&=
\left(\frac{1}{2 y }+\frac{1}{ y -1}\right) \left( \frac{dy}{dt} \right)^2
-\frac{1}{t} \frac{dy}{dt}\\
&\quad+\frac{( y -1)^2}{t^2}\left(\alpha y +\frac{\beta}{ y }\right) +\gamma\frac{ y }{t}+\delta\frac{ y ( y +1)}{ y -1}\\
\end{align}$$
- VI (Richard Fuchs):
  $$\begin{align}
\frac{d^2y}{dt^2}&=
\frac{1}{2}\left(\frac{1}{y}+\frac{1}{y-1}+\frac{1}{y-t}\right)\left( \frac{dy}{dt} \right)^2
-\left(\frac{1}{t}+\frac{1}{t-1}+\frac{1}{y-t}\right)\frac{dy}{dt} \\&\quad +
\frac{y(y-1)(y-t)}{t^2(t-1)^2}
\left\{\alpha+\beta\frac{t}{y^2}+\gamma\frac{t-1}{(y-1)^2}+\delta\frac{t(t-1)}{(y-t)^2}\right\}\\
\end{align}$$

The symbols $\alpha$, $\beta$, $\gamma$, $\delta$ denote complex-valued constants.

If $\gamma \delta \neq 0$ in $\mathrm{P}_{\mathrm{III}}$, then one can set $\gamma=1$ and $\delta=-1$, without loss of generality, by rescaling $\alpha$ and $\beta$ if necessary. If $\gamma=0$ and $\alpha \delta \neq 0$ in $\mathrm{P}_{\mathrm{III}}$, then set $\alpha=1$ and $\delta=-1$, without loss of generality. Lastly, if $\delta=0$ and $\beta \gamma \neq 0$, then one can set $\beta=-1$ and $\gamma=1$, without loss of generality.

If $\delta \neq 0$ in $\mathrm{P}_{\mathrm{V}}$, then one can set $\delta=-\frac{1}{2}$, without loss of generality.

== Singularities ==
The singularities of solutions of these equations are

- The point $\infty$, and
- The point 0 for types III, V and VI, and
- The point 1 for type VI, and
- Possibly some movable poles

For type I, the singularities are (movable) double poles of residue 0, and the solutions all have an infinite number of such poles in the complex plane. The functions with a double pole at $z_0$ have the Laurent series expansion

$$(z-z_0)^{-2}-\frac{z_0}{10}(z-z_0)^2-\frac{1}{6}(z-z_0)^3+h(z-z_0)^4+\frac{z_0^2}{300}(z-z_0)^6+\cdots$$

converging in some neighborhood of $z_0$ (where $h$ is some complex number). The location of the poles was described in detail by (Boutroux 1913, 1914). The number of poles in a ball of radius $R$ grows roughly like a constant times $R^{5/2}$.

For type II, the singularities are all (movable) simple poles.

== Asymptotics ==
=== I ===
Painlevé I solutions for $y(0)=0$ and $y'(0)=k$, for various values of $k$, with the asymptotic parabola.

There are solutions of Painlevé I such that
$$y(t)=-\sqrt{\tfrac{1}{6}|t|}+d|t|^{-1/8}\sin\left(\phi(t)-\theta_{0}\right)+o\left(|t|^{-1/8}\right)$$
where
$$\phi(t)=(24)^{1/4}\left(\tfrac{4}{5}|t|^{5/4}-\tfrac{5}{8}d^{2}\ln|t|\right)$$
and $d$ and $\theta_{0}$ are constants. There are also solutions such that
$$y(t)\sim\sqrt{\tfrac{1}{6}|t|}$$
although such solutions are unstable under perturbation.

For given initial conditions $y(0)=0$ and $y^{\prime}(0)=k$, with $k$ real, $y(t)$ has at least one pole on the real axis. There are two special values of $k$, $k_{1}$ and $k_{2}$, with the properties $-0.451428<k_{1}<-0.451427$, $1.851853<k_{2}<1.851855$, such that if $k \in (k_1, k_2)$ then the solution oscillates about, and is asymptotic to, $-\sqrt{|t|/6}$.

== Degenerations ==
The first five Painlevé equations are degenerations of the sixth equation. More precisely, some of the equations are degenerations of others according to the following diagram (see Clarkson (2006), p. 380), which also gives the corresponding degenerations of the Gauss hypergeometric function (see Clarkson (2006), p. 372)

				III Bessel
			$\nearrow$		$\searrow$
VI Gauss	→	V Kummer				II Airy	→	I None
			$\searrow$		$\nearrow$
				IV Hermite–Weber

== Hamiltonian systems ==
The Painlevé equations can all be represented as Hamiltonian systems.

Example: If we put

$$\displaystyle q=y,\quad p=y^{\prime}+y^2+t/2$$

then the second Painlevé equation

$$\displaystyle y^{\prime\prime} =2y^3+ty+b-1/2$$

is equivalent to the Hamiltonian system

$$\displaystyle q^{\prime}=\frac{\partial H}{\partial p} = p-q^2-t/2$$
$$\displaystyle p^{\prime}=-\frac{\partial H}{\partial q} = 2pq+b$$

for the Hamiltonian

$$\displaystyle H=p(p-2q^2-t)/2 -bq.$$

== Symmetries ==
A Bäcklund transform is a transformation of the dependent and independent variables of a differential equation that transforms it to a similar equation. The Painlevé equations all have discrete groups of Bäcklund transformations acting on them, which can be used to generate new solutions from known ones.

=== Example type I ===
The set of solutions of the type I Painlevé equation

$$y^{\prime\prime}=6y^2+t$$

is acted on by the order 5 symmetry $y\to\zeta^3 y$, $t\to\zeta t$ where $\zeta$ is a fifth root of 1. There are two solutions invariant under this transformation, one with a pole of order 2 at 0, and the other with a zero of order 3 at 0.

=== Example type II ===
In the Hamiltonian formalism of the type II Painlevé equation

$$\displaystyle y^{\prime\prime}=2y^3+ty+b-1/2$$

with

$$\displaystyle q=y,p=y^\prime+y^2+t/2$$

two Bäcklund transformations are given by

$$\displaystyle (q,p,b)\to (q+b/p,p,-b)$$

and

$$\displaystyle (q,p,b)\to (-q, -p+2q^2+t,1-b).$$

These both have order 2, and generate an infinite dihedral group of Bäcklund transformations (which is in fact the affine Weyl group of $A_1$; see below). If $b=1/2$ then the equation has the solution $y=0$; applying the Bäcklund transformations generates an infinite family of rational functions that are solutions, such as $y=1/t$, $y=2(t^3-2)/t(t^3-4)$, ...

Okamoto discovered that the parameter space of each Painlevé equation can be identified with the Cartan subalgebra of a semisimple Lie algebra, such that actions of the affine Weyl group lift to Bäcklund transformations of the equations. The Lie algebras for $P_I$, $P_{II}$, $P_{III}$, $P_{IV}$, $P_V$, $P_{VI}$ are 0, $A_1$, $A_1\oplus A_1$, $A_2$, $A_3$, and $D_4$.

== Special parameter values ==
$P_{\mathrm{I}}$ has no free parameters. For the other cases, they are irreducible for generic parameter values, but for special parameter values they admit solutions that satisfy a first-order Riccati equation, which can be expressed in terms of special functions:

- rational solutions for 2, 3, 4, 5, 6;
- algebraic solutions for 3, 5, 6;
- other special-function solutions: Airy for 2, Bessel for 3, parabolic-cylinder for 4, Whittaker for 5, and hypergeometric for 6.

== Relation to other areas ==
One of the main reasons Painlevé equations are studied is their relation with invariance of the monodromy of linear systems with regular singularities under changes in the locus of the poles. In particular, Painlevé VI was discovered by Richard Fuchs because of this relation. This subject is described in the article on isomonodromic deformation.

The Painlevé equations are all reductions of integrable partial differential equations; see M. J. Ablowitz and P. A. Clarkson (1991).

The Painlevé equations are all reductions of the self-dual Yang–Mills equations; see Ablowitz, Chakravarty, and Halburd (2003).

The Painlevé transcendents appear in random matrix theory in the formula for the Tracy–Widom distribution, the 2D Ising model, the asymmetric simple exclusion process and in two-dimensional quantum gravity.

$P_{\mathrm{II}}$ has been used to describe a dynamic passage through a quantum phase transition, leading to precise scaling of excitations and revealing relations to integrable multistate Landau-Zener models. Integrable generalizations of $P_{\mathrm{II}}$ have been found based on this application.

$P_{\mathrm{VI}}$ appears in two-dimensional conformal field theory: it is obeyed by combinations of conformal blocks at both $c=1$ and $c=\infty$, where $c$ is the central charge of the Virasoro algebra.
