= Tan Eng Chye =

Singaporean mathematician

- 陳永財

3rd President of the National University of Singapore
- Incumbent
- Assumed office 1 January 2018
- Preceded by: Tan Chorh Chuan

Personal details
- Education: National University of Singapore (BS); Yale University (PhD)
- Profession: College administrator
- Website: president.nus.edu.sg
- Scientific career
- Fields: Mathematics
- Workplaces: National University of Singapore
- Thesis: On Some Geometrical Properties of K-Types of Representations (1989)
- Doctoral advisor: Roger Evans Howe

Tan Eng Chye (simplified Chinese: 陈永财; traditional Chinese: 陳永財; pinyin: Chén Yǒngcái) is a Singaporean mathematician and university administrator who has been serving as the fifth president of the National University of Singapore since 2018. Prior to his presidency, he served as the deputy president of academic affairs and provost at the National University of Singapore.

== Education ==
Tan attended Raffles Institution between 1974 and 1979 before graduating from the National University of Singapore in 1985 with a Bachelor of Science (First Class Honours) degree in mathematics. He later went on to obtain his PhD from Yale University in 1989, under the guidance of Roger Howe.

== Career ==
He joined NUS as a faculty member in the Department of Mathematics in 1985, as a Senior Tutor. In June 2003, he was appointed Dean of the Faculty of Science, a post he held till March 2007. Up till 2017, he served as NUS' Deputy President (Academic Affairs) and Provost.

Tan Eng Chye's research interests are representation theory of Lie groups and Lie algebras, invariant theory and algebraic combinatorics. In collaboration with Roger Howe, he has written a graduate-level textbook on non-Abelian harmonic analysis which was described in a review as "Every chapter is full of beautiful mathematics that is not as well known as it deserves to be." He has also been active in promoting mathematics, having established the Singapore Mathematical Society Enrichment Programmes in 1994, revamped the Singapore Mathematical Olympiad in 1995 to allow more participation from students, and initiated a series of project teaching workshops for teachers in 1998. He served as president of the Singapore Mathematical Society from 2001 to 2005 and President of the South East Asian Mathematical Society from 2004 to 2005.

=== 2018–present: NUS presidency ===
On 28 July 2017, Tan was named as the next president of NUS, taking over Tan Chorh Chuan. He assumed office at the start of 2018. Along with the appointed, he was appointed to A*STAR's board as well, taking the seat meant for the university's president. In 2020, NUS raised US$300 million through its first green bond. In the same year, it established a research institute called the Asian Institute of Digital Finance along with the Monetary Authority of Singapore and National Research Foundation.

In 2020, Tan said in an interview that he had plans for NUS to "tear down structures that inhibit interdisciplinarity", with Professor Joanne Roberts of Yale-NUS College commenting that there were similarities between Yale-NUS and Tan's plans. On 22 September 2020, NUS unveiled its plans for an interdisciplinary college, the College of Humanities and Sciences, allowing students to take courses from both the Faculty of Science and the Faculty of Arts and Social Sciences. The new college took in its first intake in 2021.

As part of a broader plan to introduce interdisciplinary colleges, in 2021, Tan announced that Yale-NUS College would be closed by 2025, with 2021 intake of freshmen being the last intake. The college would also be merged with NUS' University Scholars Programme to offer a new curriculum. The decision was unilaterally made by NUS, and came as a surprise to Yale-NUS' students and faculty, NUS' faculty, and Yale. More than 10,000 people had signed a petition calling for the reversal of the decision. Questions about the decision filed in the Singapore Parliament by various members of parliament were answered on 13 September 2021.

On 21 October 2026, Tan revealed that he would not renew his five-year term and announced his retirement after his second term ends end-2027.

== Honours and awards ==
Tan received the Pingat Pentadbiran Awam, Emas (Public Administration Medal, Gold) in Singapore's National Day Awards 2014. He has been a Fellow of the Singapore National Academy of Science since 2011. He was conferred the Wilbur Lucius Cross Medal by the Yale Graduate School Alumni Association in 2018, and received an Honorary Doctor of Science from the University of Southampton, UK in the same year.

Tan was conferred the title of Knight of the French Order of the Legion of Honour on 5 July 2022, in recognition of his distinguished contributions in education and research.

== Selected works ==
- Howe, Roger; Tan, Eng-Chye (1992). Non-Abelian harmonic analysis. Applications of SL(2,R). Universitext. Springer-Verlag, New York. doi:10.1007/978-1-4613-9200-2. ISBN 0-387-97768-6.
- Howe, Roger E.; Tan, Eng-Chye (1993). "Homogeneous Functions on Light Cones: \\the Infinitesimal Structure of some Degenerate Principal Series Representations". Bulletin of the American Mathematical Society. 28: 1–75. arXiv:math/9301214. doi:10.1090/S0273-0979-1993-00360-4.
- Aslaksen, Helmer; Tan, Eng-Chye; Zhu, Chen-Bo (1995). "Invariant theory of special orthogonal groups". Pacific Journal of Mathematics. 168 (2): 207–215. doi:10.2140/pjm.1995.168.207.
- Li, Jian-Shu; Paul, Annegret; Tan, Eng-Chye; Zhu, Chen-Bo (2003). "The explicit duality correspondence of (Sp(p,q),O∗(2n))". Journal of Functional Analysis. 200 (1): 71–100. doi:10.1016/S0022-1236(02)00079-4.
- Howe, Roger; Tan, Eng-Chye; Willenbring, Jeb F. (2005). "Stable branching rules for classical symmetric pairs". Transactions of the American Mathematical Society. 357 (4): 1601–1627. arXiv:math/0311159. doi:10.1090/S0002-9947-04-03722-5.
- Howe, Roger; Jackson, Steven; Teck Lee, Soo; Tan, Eng-Chye; Willenbring, Jeb (2009). "Toric degeneration of branching algebras". Advances in Mathematics. 220 (6): 1809–1841. doi:10.1016/j.aim.2008.11.010.

Academic offices
Preceded by Tan Chorh Chuan	President of National University of Singapore; 1 January 2018 - end-2027 (scheduled)	Succeeded by To be determined
