= Jeb Willenbring =

Professor and Associate Chair

- Education: North Dakota State University, University of California, San Diego
- Known for: Representation Theory, Discrete Mathematics, and Mathematical Physics
- Scientific career
- Fields: Mathematics
- Workplaces: University of California, San Diego, Yale University, University of Wisconsin-Milwaukee
- Thesis: Stability Properties for q-Mulitplicities and Branching Formulas for Representations of the Classical Groups
- Doctoral advisor: Nolan Wallach

Jeb F. Willenbring is a Full Professor and Associate Chair for Graduate Mathematics at the University of Wisconsin-Milwaukee. Most of his research falls within the categories of Representation Theory, Discrete Mathematics, and Mathematical Physics. His current research consists of several collaborations concerning algebraic combinatorics and various aspects of Representation Theory. Willenbring has published multiple papers concerning the nature of Littlewood-Richardson coefficients, a particular focus of his, in collaboration with Professors Pamela Harris, Mark Colorusso, and William Erickson.

== Education/Academic Career ==
Willenbring attended North Dakota State University during his undergraduate years and graduated with a bachelor's degree in 1995. After graduating, he went on to pursue a PhD degree in mathematics from the University of California, San Diego. He worked with his doctoral advisor, Nolan Russell Wallach, to produce his thesis Stability Properties for q-Mulitplicities and Branching Formulas for Representations of the Classical Groups.

After receiving his PhD in mathematics in 2000, he accepted an Assistant Professor position at the University of Wisconsin-Milwaukee in 2003. He was promoted to an Associate Professor position in 2008 and to a Full Professor position in 2013. During his time at the University of Wisconsin-Milwaukee, Willenbring has taught numerous classes including Advanced Calculus, Number Theory, and Graduate Algebra and supervised 9 Graduate Student theses to the point of completion. As a legally blind professor, he is a particularly zealous advocate for students with disabilities. As a member of his university's ADA advisory committee, Willenbring successfully advocated to bring an app for visually impaired student to campus, making UWM the first university in its state to offer a free app for the blind and visually impaired.

== Publications ==
Notable publications by Jeb Willenbring include:

- Heaton, Alexander; Sriwongsa, Songpon; Willenbring, Jeb (2021), "Branching from the General Linear Group to the Symmetric Group and the Principal Embedding", Algebraic Combinatorics, 4 (2): 189–200, arXiv:1812.06211, doi:10.5802/alco.138, S2CID 119309353
- Bourn, Rebecca; Willenbring, Jeb (2020), "Expected value of the one-dimensional earth mover's distance", Algebraic Statistics, 11 (1): 53–78, arXiv:1903.03673, doi:10.2140/astat.2020.11.53, S2CID 119644799
- Lhou, Hassan; Willenbring, Jeb (2017), Chmutov (ed.), "Lowest 𝔰𝔩(2)-types in 𝔰𝔩(n)-representations", Representation Theory, 21: 20–34, arXiv:1603.04935, doi:10.1090/ert/492
- Harris, Pamela; Willenbring, Jeb; Howe, Roger; Hunziker, Markus (2014), "Sums of squares of Littlewood–Richardson coefficients and GL n -harmonic polynomials", Symmetry: Representation Theory and Its Applications, Progress in Mathematics, vol. 257, pp. 305–326, arXiv:1206.0404, doi:10.1007/978-1-4939-1590-3_11, ISBN 978-1-4939-1589-7, S2CID 118023893
- van Groningen, Anthony; Willenbring, Jeb (2014), "The Cubic, the Quartic, and the Exceptional Group G2", Developments and Retrospectives in Lie Theory, Developments in Mathematics, vol. 38, pp. 385–397, doi:10.1007/978-3-319-09804-3_17, ISBN 978-3-319-09803-6
- Hero, Michael; Willenbring, Jeb; Williams, Lauren; Adams, Jeffery; Lian, Bong; Siddhartha, Sahi (2011), "The measurement of quantum entanglement and enumeration of graph coverings", Representation Theory and Mathematical Physics, Contemporary Mathematics, vol. 557, pp. 169–181, arXiv:0911.0222, doi:10.1090/conm/557/11031, ISBN 9780821852460, S2CID 115173100
- Beder, Jay; Willenbring, Jeb (2009), "Invariance of generalized wordlength patterns", Journal of Statistical Planning and Inference, 139 (8): 2706–2714, arXiv:0901.0335, doi:10.1016/j.jspi.2008.12.005, S2CID 17550812
- Howe, Roger; Jackson, Steven; Teck Lee, Soo; Tan, Eng-Chye; Willenbring, Jeb (2009), "Toric degeneration of branching algebras", Advances in Mathematics, 220 (6): 1809–1841, doi:10.1016/j.aim.2008.11.010
- Musson, Ian; Willenbring, Jeb (2008), "Invariant Differential Operators and FCR Factors of Enveloping Algebras", Communications in Algebra, 36 (10): 3759–3777, arXiv:math/0409561, doi:10.1080/00927870802160529, S2CID 15769669
- Willenbring, Jeb; Zuckerman, Gregg (2008), "A generating function for Blattner's formula", Proceedings of the American Mathematical Society, 136 (6): 2261–2270, arXiv:math/0612266, doi:10.1090/S0002-9939-08-09284-8, S2CID 16068711

== Awards ==
Willenbring has received numerous awards and grants. After graduating from his PhD Program, he taught at Yale University from 2000–2003 and was granted NSF VIGRE funding. In 2013, Willenbring was named as a fellow of the American Mathematics Society as part of its inaugural class of fellows. Recognizing his work towards increasing campus accessibility, Willenbring also received a UWM Accessibility Resource Center Excellence Award in 2016.
