= International Mathematics Research Notices =

- Discipline: Mathematics
- Language: English
- Edited by: Zeev Rudnick

Publication details
- History: 1991–present
- Publisher: Oxford University Press
- Frequency: Monthly
- Impact factor: 1.600 (2020)

Standard abbreviations
- ISO 4: Int. Math. Res. Not.
- MathSciNet: Int. Math. Res. Not. IMRN

Indexing
- ISSN: 1073-7928 (print); 1687-0247 (web)
- OCLC no.: 34987691

Links
- Journal homepage; Online access; Online archive

The International Mathematics Research Notices is a peer-reviewed mathematics journal. Originally published by Duke University Press, it is now published by Oxford University Press. The Executive Editor is Zeev Rudnick (Tel Aviv University). According to the Journal Citation Reports, the journal has a 2018 impact factor of 1.452, ranking it 40th out of 317 journals in the category "Mathematics". According to SCImago Journal & Country Rank, International Mathematics Research Notices is ranked top 48th of more than 371 internationally circulated journals in the field of mathematics.

In 2009, International Mathematics Research Papers merged with the journal.

== Indexation ==
The articles of the International Mathematics Research Notices are indexed or referenced in the following bases:

- American Mathematical Society
- Corrosion Abstracts
- CSA Civil Engineering Abstracts
- CSA Engineering Materials Abstracts
- Current Contents® /Physical, Chemical and Earth Sciences
- Journal Citation Reports /Science Edition
- Mathematical Reviews (MR)
- Science Citation Index Expanded
- Science Citation Index
- Statistical Theory & Method Abstracts (STMA-Z)
- The Standard Periodical Directory
- Zentralblatt MATH
