= National Institute of Education =

Teacher education institute in Singapore

- Block 4, the circular building housing the NIE Library
- Former names: Teachers' Training College (1950–1973); Institute of Education (1973–1991)
- Type: Autonomous institute of a public university
- Established: 1 July 1991; 35 years ago (origins in 1950)
- Parent institution: Nanyang Technological University
- Director: Liu Woon Chia
- Location: 1 Nanyang Walk, Singapore 637616, Singapore; 1.3492301°N 103.678124°E
- Website: www.ntu.edu.sg/nie

The National Institute of Education (NIE) is an autonomous institute of Nanyang Technological University (NTU) in Singapore and the country's national teacher education institute. It prepares teachers for Singapore's schools, offers undergraduate and graduate degrees in education and related fields, runs professional development and leadership programmes for serving educators, and conducts educational research.

NIE traces its origins to the Teachers' Training College, founded in 1950. The college was replaced by the Institute of Education in 1973, which merged with the College of Physical Education on 1 July 1991 to form NIE as part of the newly established NTU. The institute has been located on NTU's Yunnan Garden campus since December 2000.

== History ==
=== Predecessors (1950–1991) ===
The Teachers' Training College (TTC) began its first session on 1 March 1950 in the former Anglo-Chinese School building at Cairnhill, and later moved to Paterson Road. It was Singapore's first permanent, full-time training college for English-medium school teachers, and later extended its training to teachers of the Chinese, Malay and Tamil streams. Prime Minister Lee Kuan Yew officially opened the college's new auditorium and building complex on 16 February 1968.

On 1 April 1973 the TTC was reconstituted as the Institute of Education (IE), which took over the functions of the TTC, the Research Unit of the Ministry of Education and the School of Education of the University of Singapore. Ruth Wong, who had been appointed principal of the TTC in 1971, became the IE's first director. The IE moved to a campus in Bukit Timah in 1981, and in July 1984 the College of Physical Education (CPE) was established there as an autonomous college to train specialist physical education teachers.

=== National Institute of Education (1991–present) ===
On 1 July 1991 the IE and the CPE were merged to form the National Institute of Education, an autonomous institute of Nanyang Technological University, which was reconstituted from the former Nanyang Technological Institute. Gloria Lim was appointed its founding director. NIE began offering master's and doctoral programmes in July 1992.

In December 2000 NIE moved from Bukit Timah to a new S$400 million campus at Yunnan Garden in Jurong, within NTU's main campus. The Centre for Research in Pedagogy and Practice was established in 2003, and the Office of Education Research in 2008. In 2009 NIE launched its Teacher Education Model for the 21st Century (TE21). During the 2010 Summer Youth Olympics, NTU hosted the Youth Olympic Village; NIE's Village Square served as its centre and the NIE Library as its Digital Media Centre.

NIE marked its 70th anniversary in 2020, when President Halimah Yacob unveiled an orchid hybrid, Papilionanda NIE SG, named in its honour. In 2025 it marked 75 years of teacher education with a year-long celebration.

=== Directors ===
Director	Tenure
Gloria Lim	1991–1994
Leo Tan	1994–2006
Lee Sing Kong	2006–2014
Tan Oon Seng	2014–2018
Christine Goh	2018–2024
Liu Woon Chia	2024–present

== Organisation ==
NIE is headed by a director. Liu Woon Chia, previously Dean of Teacher Education, became director on 1 July 2024, succeeding Christine Goh. The institute's academic staff are organised into ten academic departments:

- Asian Languages & Cultures
- English Language & Literature
- Humanities & Social Studies Education
- Learning Sciences & Assessment
- Mathematics & Mathematics Education
- Natural Sciences & Science Education
- Physical Education & Sport Science
- Policy, Curriculum & Leadership
- Psychology and Child & Human Development
- Visual & Performing Arts

Its research centres include the Centre for Research in Pedagogy and Practice, the Singapore Centre for Character and Citizenship Education, the Centre for Research in Child Development, the Centre for Arts Research in Education and the Science of Learning in Education Centre. NIE International Private Limited, a subsidiary, provides education consultancy and programmes for overseas clients.

NIE's strategic plan for the academic years 2026/27 to 2030/31, NIE2030, is themed "Empowering Educators and Co-creating Communities for Flourishing Futures".

== Programmes ==
NIE provides initial teacher preparation for the Ministry of Education, as well as degree programmes and professional learning courses for serving teachers. At undergraduate level it offers a double major programme, in which students read education together with a second subject and graduate with a Bachelor of Arts or Bachelor of Science, and a four-year Bachelor of Science in Sport Science and Management. Graduate programmes include master's and doctoral degrees.

For school leaders, NIE runs the Leaders in Education Programme, a seven-month full-time programme that prepares selected education officers for principalship. In July 2025 NIE's annual Teachers' Investiture Ceremony marked the graduation of 721 new and returning teachers.

== Campus ==
The Nanyang Playhouse

NIE's campus, at 1 Nanyang Walk, is part of NTU's Yunnan Garden campus. It includes a purpose-built art gallery, which opened on 16 March 2009.

Lecture Theatre 1

Tennis courts

Planted "NIE" lettering on a lawn

== Rankings ==
In the QS World University Rankings by Subject 2026, NIE was ranked 8th in the world for Education and Training.
