= Chen Yongcai =

Chen Yongcai may refer to:

- Tan Eng Chye, Singaporean mathematician and president of the National University of Singapore
- Bruce Chen (born 1977), Panamanian baseball player who represented China in 2017
