= Chen-Bo Zhu =

Singaporean mathematician

Chen-Bo Zhu, also known as Zhu Chengbo (Chinese: 朱程波), is a Chinese-born Singaporean mathematician working in representation theory of Lie groups. He was Head of the Department of Mathematics at the National University of Singapore from 2014 to 2020. Zhu served as President of the Singapore Mathematical Society from 2009 to 2012 and Vice President of the Southeast Asian Mathematical Society from 2012 to 2013.

== Biography ==
Zhu was born in September 1964 in Yin County (鄞县, current Yinzhou District), Ningbo, Zhejiang Province in China, Zhu attended Yinzhou High School from 1978 to 1980 and studied mathematics as an undergraduate at Zhejiang University from 1980 to 1984. In 1984, Zhu was among the 15 students nationwide selected by the Government of China and by a joint AMS-SIAM committee for PhD study in the U.S. (also known as the Shiing-Shen Chern Program). Subsequently, he went to Yale University in 1985 and obtained his PhD in 1990, under the direction of Roger Howe. Zhu joined the Department of Mathematics at NUS in 1991, and became a Singapore citizen in 1995.

== Contributions ==
In representation theory, Zhu’s work is focused on classical groups and their smooth representations. Jointly with Sun Binyong, he proved multiplicity at most one for the branching (also called strong Gelfand pair property) of irreducible Casselman-Wallach representations of classical groups in the Archimedean case, and the conservation relation conjecture of Stephen S. Kudla and Stephen Rallis. He has also applied Howe correspondence to the structural study of degenerate representations and to the understanding of singularities for infinite-dimensional representations.

== Selected works ==
- Sun, Binyong; Zhu, Chen-Bo (2012), "Multiplicity one theorems: the Archimedean case", Annals of Mathematics, 175 (1): 23–44, arXiv:0903.1413, doi:10.4007/annals.2012.175.1.2
- Sun, Binyong; Zhu, Chen-Bo (2015), "Conservation relations for local theta correspondence", Journal of the American Mathematical Society, 28 (4): 939–983, arXiv:1204.2969, doi:10.1090/s0894-0347-2014-00817-1, S2CID 5936119
- Lee, Soo Teck; Zhu, Chen-Bo (1998), "Degenerate principal series and local theta correspondence", Transactions of the American Mathematical Society, 350 (12): 5017–5046, doi:10.1090/s0002-9947-98-02036-4
- Gomez, Raul; Zhu, Chen-Bo (2014), "Local theta lifting of generalized Whittaker models associated to nilpotent orbits", Geometric and Functional Analysis, 24 (3): 796–853, arXiv:1302.3744, doi:10.1007/s00039-014-0276-5, S2CID 119596509

== Awards and honors ==
Zhu has been a Fellow of the Singapore National Academy of Science since 2014.
