= Pamela E. Harris =

Mexican-American mathematician

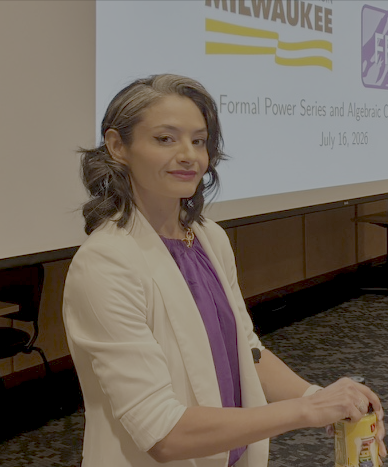
- Harris in 2026
- Born: November 28, 1983 (age 42)
- Education: Marquette University; University of Wisconsin–Milwaukee
- Awards: Mathematical Association of America; Henry L. Alder Award (2019); Karen EDGE Fellow (2020)
- Scientific career
- Fields: Mathematician
- Institutions: Williams College; University of Wisconsin-Milwaukee
- Thesis: Combinatorial problems related to Kostant’s weight multiplicity formula (2012)
- Doctoral advisor: Jeb Willenbring

Pamela Estephania Harris (born November 28, 1983) is a Mexican-American mathematician, educator and advocate for immigrants. She is currently a professor at the University of Wisconsin-Milwaukee in Milwaukee, Wisconsin, was formerly an associate professor at Williams College in Williamstown, Massachusetts and is co-founder of the online platform Lathisms. She is also an editor of the e-mentoring blog of the American Mathematical Society (AMS).

== Early life and career ==
Harris first emigrated with her family from Mexico to the United States when she was 8 years old. They returned to Mexico, before eventually settling in Wisconsin when Harris was 12. Because she was undocumented, she could not attend university. Instead, she studied at the Milwaukee Area Technical College, where she earned two associate degrees in two and a half years. After she married a US citizen and her immigration status changed, she transferred to Marquette University, where she obtained a bachelor's degree in mathematics. She went on to complete her master's degree and in 2012 a PhD at the University of Wisconsin-Milwaukee. Her Ph.D. dissertation was advised by Jeb F. Willenbring. Harris was a Project NExT (New Experiences in Teaching) fellow in 2012. She was a Davies Research Fellow at the United States Military Academy, and, in 2016, joined the faculty at Williams College where she was an associate professor. In 2022, she joined the faculty at the University of Wisconsin-Milwaukee as an associate professor.

Harris studies algebraic combinatorics, in particular the representation of Lie algebras. In order to understand this representation she studies vector partition functions, in particular Kostant's partition function. She is also interested in graph theory and number theory. In 2016 she co-founded an online platform called 'Lathisms' which aims to promote the contributions of Latinxs and Hispanics in the Mathematical Sciences. In 2020 she co-authored the book "Asked and Answered: Dialogues On Advocating For Students of Color in Mathematics". Harris, along with Aris Winger, run a podcast, Mathematically Uncensored, through the Center for Minorities in the Mathematical Sciences. Starting in October 2020, they discussed current issues in mathematics that minorities encounter.

== Recognition ==
In 2020, Harris was selected as part of the inaugural class of Karen EDGE Fellows. In 2019, Harris won the Mathematical Association of America Henry L. Alder Award for Distinguished Teaching by a Beginning College or University Mathematics Faculty Member, for her mentorship towards undergraduate research and for being a "fierce advocate for a diverse and inclusive mathematics community." She further received the early career Faculty Mentor Award from the Council of Undergraduate Research in the Mathematics and Computer Sciences Division. She was a 2022 winner of the Deborah and Franklin Haimo Awards for Distinguished College or University Teaching of Mathematics.

She gave one of the Mathematical Association of America Invited Addresses at the 2019 Joint Mathematics Meetings. In 2019 she was a featured speaker at the national conference of the Society for the Advancement of Chicanos/Hispanics and Native Americans in Science (SACNAS). She was named a Fellow of the American Mathematical Society, in the 2022 class of fellows, "for contributions to algebraic combinatorics, for mentorship of undergraduate researchers, and for contributions to a more equitable and inclusive mathematical community". In 2022 she will become a fellow of the Association for Women in Mathematics, "For exceptional leadership in establishing programs and mentoring networks that support, encourage, and advance women and underrepresented minorities in the mathematical sciences; and for contributions through public speaking that create positive systemic change in the culture and climate of the mathematics profession."

In 2018 Harris was featured in the book Power in Numbers: The Rebel Women of Mathematics.
