= Calvin C. Moore =

American mathematician (1936–2023)

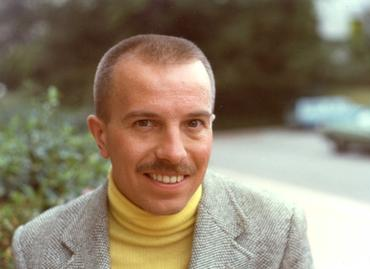
- Moore in 1974
- Born: November 2, 1936; New York City, United States
- Died: July 26, 2023
- Education: Harvard University
- Scientific career
- Workplaces: University of California, Berkeley
- Doctoral advisor: George Mackey
- Doctoral students: Roger Howe; Truman Bewley; Bruce Blackadar; Michael Erceg

Calvin C. Moore (November 2, 1936 – July 26, 2023) was an American mathematician who worked in the theory of operator algebras and topological groups.

Moore graduated from Harvard University with a bachelor's degree in 1958 and with a Ph.D. in 1960 under the supervision of George Mackey (Extensions and cohomology theory of locally compact groups). In 1961 he became assistant professor at the University of California, Berkeley and professor in 1966. From 1977 to 1980, he was director of the Center for Pure and Applied mathematics.

With Shiing-Shen Chern and Isadore Singer, he co-founded Mathematical Sciences Research Institute in 1982. From 1964 to 1965 he was at the Institute for Advanced Study in Princeton, New Jersey.

He was a fellow of the American Academy of Arts and Sciences. From 1965 to 1967 he was a Sloan Fellow. From 1971 to 1979 he was a member of the Board of Trustees of the American Mathematical Society, whose fellow he is. Since 1977, he is co-editor of the Pacific Journal of Mathematics. From 1978 to 1979 he was a Miller research professor at Berkeley.

He has written on a history of mathematics at Berkeley.

His students include Roger Howe, Truman Bewley, Bruce Blackadar, and Michael Erceg.

== Writings ==
- With Claude Schochet, Global Analysis on Foliated Spaces, MSRI Publications, Springer Verlag 1988, 2nd ed., Cambridge University Press 2006.
