= Singapore Mathematical Society =

The Singapore Mathematical Society is the primary organization "representing and advancing the interests of the mathematical community in Singapore".

SMS is Singapore's Adhering Organization for the International Mathematical Union. SMS is also an institutional member of the Singapore National Academy of Science.

The society runs various mathematics-related events in Singapore. Annual competitions such as the Singapore Mathematical Olympiad, Singapore Mathematics Project Festival and SMS Essay Competition are organised by the SMS. Some initiatives are aimed at the general public, such as workshops and lecture series, while others are professional development opportunities for Singaporean mathematics educators.

SMS also provides logistical support for the Singapore International Mathematical Olympiad (SIMO) team and the representative team at the International Mathematical Olympiad (IMO) alongside the Ministry of Education.

== History ==
The Singapore Mathematical Society originally began as the Malayan Mathematical Society in 1952, founded by Alexander Oppenheim who became its first president. At the time, the SMS was hosted in the University of Malaya's Singapore campus, which later became the National University of Singapore.

SMS began publishing mathematics research under the Bulletin of the Malayan Mathematical Society, which was later renamed to the Bulletin of the Singapore Mathematical Society. The publication has ceased in favour of publishing research in international journals.

SMS started the Inter-school Mathematical Competition in 1956. The annual mathematics competition was later renamed to the Singapore Mathematical Olympiad in 1995.

Shortly after Singapore's independence in 1965, the Malayan Mathematical Society was renamed in 1967 to the Singapore Mathematical Society.

In 1975, the SMS joined the International Mathematical Union as Singapore's representative mathematical society. It also joined the Singapore National Academy of Science alongside the Institute of Physics, Singapore National Institute of Chemistry and the Singapore Institute of Biology.

== Events ==
SMS organises a number of major annual events aimed at promoting mathematics, mostly targeted towards pre-tertiary (primary and secondary school) students in Singaporean schools.

=== Singapore Mathematical Olympiad ===
The Singapore Mathematical Olympiad is Singapore's largest annual mathematics competition for pre-tertiary students. The competition tests students' ability to solve mathematics problems that go beyond those taught in schools. The problems may require an understanding of topics outside the syllabus together with some level of ingenuity and creative thinking.

SMS organizes the Singapore Mathematical Olympiad (SMO) from late May to early July. The first round is usually held during the first week of the June holidays, consisting of a 3-hour paper with 25 short-answer problems requiring only integer answers from 0 to 9999. Each problem in the first round is worth one point, and the top students in the first round are selected for the second round.

The second round is usually held during the last weekend of the June holidays and the weekend immediately after the June holidays, consisting of 5 proof-style problems in 5 hours. Each problem is worth 10 points, and the scores of Round 1 and 2 are combined to determine the overall winner of the SMO.

=== Singapore Mathematical Project Festival ===
The Singapore Mathematical Project Festival (SMPF) is a project work competition for secondary school students in Singapore. It was launched in 2001 "in recognition of the fact that creative and innovative work in mathematics may best be reflected in project work".

The festival consists of two categories, Junior and Senior. Junior category participants are required to be either Secondary One or Two for those in the Express Stream, and Secondary One, Two or Three for those in the Normal Stream. Secondary schools may register teams of up to four students from their school to participate.

Two rounds of presentations occur during the festival. All projects submit a written report and provide a 20 minute presentation video during the preliminary round. Teams deemed to have the potential of obtaining a Silver Medal or higher are invited to a second round during the festival congress later in the year.

=== SMS Essay Competition ===
The SMS Essay competition is an annual themed essay competition, where students write mathematics-related essays based on a theme that changes each year. The competition is split into three categories (Category A, B and C) by student grade. Essays can be written by a team of up to three students. Essays consist of an abstract and a main body, the former of which is at most 100 words and the latter must be between 1000 and 1500 words. Winning entries may be published in the Singapore Mathematical Medley.

The first edition of the SMS Essay Competition began as the SMS Euler 300th Anniversary Essay Competition 2007. It was intended to introduce students to mathematical history (specifically in this case, the contributions of Leonhard Euler) and appreciate its importance in understanding mathematics as a subject.

=== Annual Prize Presentation ===
An annual prize presentation is collectively held for the SMO, SMPF and SMS Essay Competition, usually in around August to September.

Selected projects in the SMPF may be invited to present their work during the prize presentation ceremony.

The full ranking order of the top 10 contestants in each category of the SMO are also only revealed during the prize presentation, as official results before the prize presentation only indicate which students are within the top 10 and not their relative order.

=== SMS Lecture Series ===
The SMS Lecture Series is an initiative started in 2007 where distinguished local mathematicians and educators are invited to speak about their work in a public setting. All speakers up to 2023 have been lecturers in either the National University of Singapore or Nanyang Technological University.

Subjects presented vary from abstract mathematics such as generalised functions and graph theory, to applied mathematics in bitcoin and probability. Difficulty of the content varies, though the lectures claim to be suitable for Junior College students or higher.

=== Supported Events ===
The SMS supports the annual Mathematics Teachers Conference organised by the Association of Mathematics Educators from NIE.

== Awards ==
Outside the annual Prize Presentation, the SMS disburses various academic awards (known as book prizes) to students with exceptional academic performances in Singaporean tertiary education institutes. The institutions that receive each prize are indicated in the awards below.

=== The Singapore Mathematical Society Gold Medal and Book Prize ===
Awarded to outstanding undergraduates studying Mathematics at either National University of Singapore (since 1995) or Nanyang Technological University (since 2009)

=== The Singapore Mathematical Society Book Prize ===
Awarded to the best PhD thesis in Mathematical Sciences from Nanyang Technological University.

=== The Singapore Mathematical Society Book Prize for Engineering Mathematics ===
Awarded to the student in Temasek Polytechnic in the School of Engineering with the highest score in Mathematics 1, 2 and 3.

== Publishing ==
The Singapore Mathematical Medley is the main publication of the SMS. It was first released in 1973 and have since published 47 volumes up to the 2021 edition. Each volume consists of two publications, named No. 1 and No. 2. Each edition includes information about the societies' past activities alongside mathematics content such as puzzles. Reports from the IMO team of that year as well as winning essays and projects from the SMS Essay Competition and the SMPF may also be included each edition.

SMS also publishes the problems and solutions for the SMO of each year after the competition has concluded. 5-year compilations from 2005 to 2019 and a 10-year compilation from 1995 to 2004 are also available.

== Management ==
The current management committee of SMS comprises

- President: Prof. Ng Keng Meng (NTU)
- Vice Presidents: Prof. Adrian Roellin (NUS), Assoc. Prof. Toh Pee Choon (NIE), Dr Hang Kim Hoo (MOE)
