= Gloria Lim =

Singaporean mycologist (1930–2022)

- Born: 1930; Singapore
- Died: 11 July 2022 (aged 91–92)
- Occupations: Mycologist, university professor
- Years active: 1957–2011
- Known for: First woman dean of the faculty of science, University of Singapore; First woman commissioner of the Public Service Commission

Gloria Lim BBM (1930 – 11 July 2022) was a Singaporean mycologist whose research focused on tropical fungi and who built up a fungal repository of regional samples. Lim was twice appointed as Dean of the Faculty of Science at the University of Singapore (now the National University of Singapore), the first woman to hold that position. After her retirement, she became the first Director of Singapore's National Institute of Education and helped it launch a university degree program. She served on the Public Service Commission as its first woman commissioner for 14 years, and then served as general manager of the Community Mediation Unit for 8 years.

Lim received numerous honours and awards for her contributions to science and to improving education in Singapore. She died on 11 July 2022.

== Early life and education ==
Gloria Lim was born in Singapore in 1930. While the girls school she attended did not teach sciences, she graduated from the University of Singapore with a BS in botany with first-class honours in 1954. She earned a Diploma in Education in 1956 and an MS in plant pathology in 1957 from the University of Malaya in Kuala Lumpur.

Lim began teaching at the Raffles Girls' School; she later was hired to teach at the University of Malaya and divided her time teaching at Raffles in the morning and botany at the university in the afternoons. She was awarded an Inter-University Council Fellowship which allowed her to attend the University of London. Lim earned her doctorate in 1961 and then attended the University of California, Berkeley, on a Fulbright Fellowship between 1966 and 1967, becoming a mycologist.

== Scientific career ==
Returning to Singapore, Lim became an expert on fungi and built up a unique repository of the region's fungal species, writing hundreds of research articles and consulting with universities and businesses at home and abroad. She worked on the advisory board of a company developing medicinal mushrooms, and assisted the Singaporean Ministry of Defence when their storage bunkers developed mould. After her retirement, the collection of various species was disassembled and destroyed.

== Academic career ==
Lim was named Dean of the Faculty of Science at the University of Singapore in 1973, becoming the first woman to hold the position. Her first appointment lasted four years and then she was appointed again to serve in 1979, but she resigned in 1980 when the university merged with Nanyang University, to allow Nanyang's former Dean to continue in the post. In 1982 she became the first woman to serve on the Public Service Commission (PSC), and in 1985 became the first woman to head the Department of Botany when the university became the National University of Singapore (NUS). Lim retired from the NUS in 1991 and took a position at the National Institute of Education (NIE) as its inaugural director. Her job was to develop the Institute of Education (IE) on a fully accredited university standard; when she retired in 1994, the program was offering undergraduate, graduate, and doctoral degree programs.

== Other activities ==
Between 2003 and 2011, Lim served as general manager of the Community Mediation Unit (CMU), a board designed to solve community disputes.

== Awards and honours ==
In 1993 Lim was honoured with the Bintang Bakti Masyarakat (Public Service Star) for her contributions to the PSC, which she continued to serve until 1996. Lim retired from NIE in 1994. In July 1999, she was awarded an honorary Doctorate of Science from Loughborough University in England for her contributions to science and education in Singapore.

In 2005, Lim was honoured with the Distinguished Science Alumni Awards from the NUS and in 2014 she was one of the inaugural class of inductees into the Singapore Women's Hall of Fame.

== Selected works ==
- Lim, Gloria (1961). Microbiological factors influencing infection of cloverby nodule bacteria (PhD). University of London.
- Lim, Gloria (1963). "Studies on the Physiology of Nodule Formation: VIII. The Influence of the Size of the Rhizosphere Population of Nodule Bacteria on Root Hair Infection in Clover". Annals of Botany. 27 (105). Oxford University Press: 55–67. doi:10.1093/oxfordjournals.aob.a083835.
- Lim, Gloria; Khew, E; Yeoh, H H (March 1985). "Extracellular enzymes of some black aspergilli in Singapore". MIRCEN Journal of Applied Microbiology and Biotechnology. 1 (1). Oxford University Press/UNESCO: 55–61. doi:10.1007/bf01748154. S2CID 87528422.
- Lim, Gloria (1985). Proceedings of a workshop on plant viruses and mycoplasmas held at the National University of Singapore, Botany Department, 24–27 May 1983 (Report). Asian Network for Biological Sciences.
- Louis, Isabelle; Lim, Gloria (March 1987). "Spore density and root colonization of vesicular-arbuscular mycorrhizas in tropical soil". Transactions of the British Mycological Society. 88 (2): 207–212. Bibcode:1987TrBMS..88..207L. doi:10.1016/s0007-1536(87)80216-4.
- Jones, E B Gareth; Lim, Gloria (July 1990). "Edible mushrooms in Singapore and other Southeast Asian countries". Mycologist. 4 (3): 119–124. doi:10.1016/s0269-915x(09)80038-4.
- Lim, Gloria (2004). Molecular cytogenetic characterization of complex genomic rearrangements in osteosarcoma. National Library of Canada (Thesis). Ottawa.

The standard author abbreviation Lim is used to indicate this person as the author when citing a botanical name.

== Bibliography ==
- Tan, Rebecca (2015). "Bloom Where You Are Planted" (PDF). In Chan, Juliana; Chua, Grace; Sim, Shuzhen; et al. (eds.). Singapore's Scientific Pioneers. Singapore: Asian Scientist Publishing Pte Ltd. ISBN 978-981-09-5893-0.
