= Ju-Lee Kim =

South Korean-American mathematician

- 김주리
- Born: 1969 (age 56–57)
- Known for: Representation Theory of p-adic groups
- Title: Professor

Academic background
- Education: Yale University
- Thesis: Hecke Algebras of Symplectic Groups over P-Adic Fields and Supercuspidal Representations (1997)
- Doctoral advisor: Roger Evans Howe

Academic work
- Discipline: Mathematics
- Institutions: MIT; University of Michigan; University of Illinois at Chicago
- Website: {http://math.mit.edu/directory/profile.php?pid=132

Ju-Lee Kim (김주리, born 1969) is a South Korean mathematician who works as a professor of mathematics at the Massachusetts Institute of Technology (MIT). Her research involves the representation theory of p-adic groups.

== Education and career ==
Kim completed her undergraduate studies at KAIST in 1991, and earned a Ph.D. from Yale University in 1997 supervised by Roger Howe; at Yale, she was also mentored by Ilya Piatetski-Shapiro.

After postdoctoral study at the Institute for Advanced Study and the École Normale Supérieure, she joined the faculty as an assistant professor at the University of Michigan in 1998. Kim joined the faculty at University of Illinois at Chicago in 2002, and then moved to MIT in 2007.

== Recognition ==
In 2015 she was elected as a fellow of the American Mathematical Society "for contributions to the representation theory of semisimple groups over nonarchimedean local fields and for service to the profession."

== Personal ==
Her husband, Paul Seidel, is also a mathematician at MIT.
