= Truman Bewley =

American economist

Truman F. Bewley
- Born: July 19, 1941 (age 85)
- Education: University of California, Berkeley
- Scientific career
- Fields: Mathematical economics
- Workplaces: Yale University
- Doctoral advisor: Calvin C. Moore
- Doctoral students: Stephen Morris; James A. Robinson; Dean Corbae

Truman Fassett Bewley (born July 19, 1941) is an American economist. He is the Alfred Cowles Professor of Economics at Yale University. Originally specializing in mathematical economics and general equilibrium theory, since the late 1990s Bewley has gained renown for his work on sticky wages. In Bewley's 1999 book Why Wages Don't Fall During a Recession, hundreds of interviews with executives, labor leaders, and other professionals establish morale as an important factor in why businesses are reluctant to decrease employee compensation at times of low demand.

In general equilibrium theory, Bewley (1972) established key existence results for models with infinitely many goods.

Due to Bewley (1977), Bewley is the namesake of Bewley models, the class of incomplete markets general equilibrium models in which agents face idiosyncratic income shocks and achieve partial insurance via, for example, a risk-free bond or capital. Aiyagari (1994), Huggett (1993), and Krusell and Smith (1998) are examples of Bewley models, each with many hundreds of citations according to Google Scholar.

Bewley was elected a fellow of the American Academy of Arts and Sciences in 2005. In 2012 he was elected a distinguished fellow of the American Economic Association.
