= Tan Chorh Chuan =

Singaporean academic

Tan Chorh Chuan DUBC PJG BBM PPA(E)
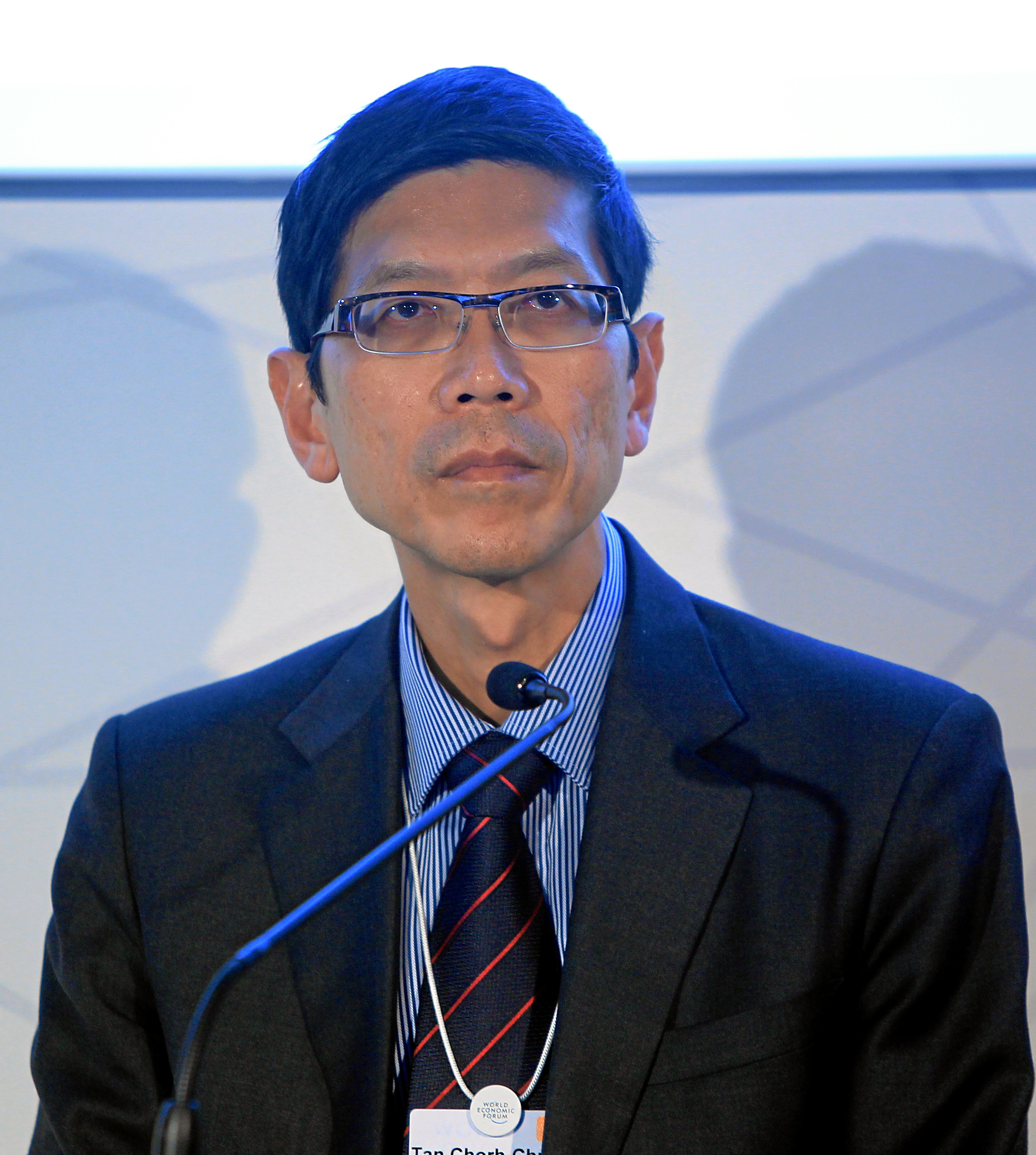
- Tan at the World Economic Forum Annual Meeting in 2013

2nd President of the National University of Singapore
- In office 1 December 2008 – 31 December 2017
- Preceded by: Shih Choon Fong
- Succeeded by: Tan Eng Chye

Personal details
- Born: 1959 (age 66–67) Singapore
- Education: National University of Singapore
- Profession: Professor
- Scientific career
- Fields: Medicine
- Workplaces: National University of Singapore
- Thesis: Regulation of erythropoietin messenger RNA (1992)

Tan Chorh Chuan DUBC PJG BBM PPA(E) (Chinese: 陈祝全; pinyin: Chén Zhùquán) is a Singaporean college administrator and professor who served as the second president of the National University of Singapore (NUS) between 2008 and 2017. He is currently a professor at the National University of Singapore.

Tan was recognised for his leadership contributions to overcoming the Severe acute respiratory syndrome (SARS) epidemic in 2003, while serving as the Director of Medical Services in Ministry of Health (MOH) between 2000 and 2004.

Since January 2018, he has been the Chief Health Scientist at MOH and Executive Director of MOH's new Office for Healthcare Transformation, driving transformation of Singapore's healthcare system.

== Early life and education ==
Born into a family of nine children, Tan studied in St. Joseph’s Institution, Catholic Junior College, before graduating from the NUS's Faculty of Medicine in 1983 on a scholarship from Public Service Commission. Tan completed his PhD in 1992 with a dissertation entitled "Regulation of erythropoietin messenger RNA".

== Career ==
Upon graduation in 1983, Tan started his medical career as a renal physician. From 1987, he took on concurrent hospital and academic roles beginning as a faculty member with the Department of Medicine at NUS and Registrar, Division of Nephrology, Department of Medicine at National University Hospital (NUH). In 1997, he became a Senior Consultant with the Division of Nephrology at NUH, and in 1999, a Professor of Medicine with NUS. He was the Chief and Head of the Department of Medicine at both NUS and NUH from 1997 to 1998. Subsequently, he became the Dean of Faculty of Medicine, NUS and also Chairman of the NUH Medical Board from 1997 to 2000.

Tan was appointed as the Director of Medical Services at MOH from 2000 to 2004. During his tenure, he led the public health response to SARS in 2003.

Tan served as the NUS's Provost and Deputy President between 2004 and 2007 and then as Senior Deputy President before assuming the appointment of President from December 2008 to December 2017. In 2005, he helped established the Duke–NUS Medical School, Singapore's first US-style graduate-entry medical school, serving as the Deputy Chairman of the School's governing body, then as a senior advisor to the body. Tan was also responsible for setting up, in partnership with Yale University, the Yale-NUS College, Singapore's first liberal arts college. In 2008, Tan served as the chief executive for the National University Health System, bringing the various academic health institutions such as Yong Loo Lin School of Medicine, Faculty of Dentistry, and health institutions such as National University Hospital under an unified governance.

Tan also served on Singapore's Agency for Science, Technology and Research's (A*STAR) board as a deputy chairman from 2004 to 2017. As of 2018, he was also the chairman of A*STAR's Committee of Government Scientific Advisors. (Note: Taking the archived reference's last updated date, 27 November 2018 as the year he was appointed.)

Since January 2018, Tan has been the Chief Health Scientist at MOH and Executive Director of its new Office for Healthcare Transformation, formed in 2018 to help accelerate, drive and contribute to the transformation of Singapore's healthcare system. In response to COVID-19 pandemic in Singapore, Tan was appointed to the 14-member Expert Committee on COVID-19 Vaccination on 5 October 2020, which is to advise and assess on the efficacy and safety of COVID-19 vaccines for use in Singapore.

== Other activities ==
- Geneva Science and Diplomacy Anticipator (GESDA), Member of the Board of Directors (since 2020)

== Awards and honours ==
Tan was awarded Bintang Bakti Masyarakat (Public Service Star) for his contributions to overcoming the SARS epidemic in 2003, and Pingat Pentadbiran Awam (Emas) (Public Administration Gold Medal) for his directorship tenure at MOH in 2004. He was awarded the National Science and Technology Medal in 2008. In 2015, he was awarded Pingat Jasa Gemilang (Meritorious Service Medal) for his role as the President of NUS. In 2018, Tan was awarded NUS' highest academic appointment of University Professor.

Tan was elected to be an international member of the USA National Academy of Medicine in 2015. Tan chaired World Economic Forum's Global University Leaders Forum from 2014 to 2016. In 2016, Tan became a laureate of the Asian Scientist 100 by the Asian Scientist.

Tan also received several honorary doctorates from:

- Loughborough University UK (2009)
- Duke University USA (2011)
- King's College London, UK (2012)

Tan was awarded the Darjah Utama Bakti Cemerlang (Distinguished Service Order) in 2022

== Personal life ==
Tan is married to Evelyn Lee, a consultant anaesthetist.

== Notes ==
Academic offices
Preceded by Shih Choon Fong	President of National University of Singapore; 1 December 2008 – 31 December 2017	Succeeded by Tan Eng Chye
