= Nolan Wallach =

American mathematician (born 1940)

Nolan Russell Wallach
- Born: August 3, 1940 (age 86); Brooklyn, New York, US
- Education: Washington University in St. Louis; University of Maryland
- Awards: Alfred P. Sloan Research Fellowship
- Scientific career
- Fields: Mathematics
- Workplaces: UCSD

Nolan Russell Wallach (born August 3, 1940) is a mathematician known for work in the representation theory of reductive algebraic groups. He is the author of the two-volume treatise Real Reductive Groups.

== Education and career ==
Wallach did his undergraduate studies at the University of Maryland, graduating in 1962. He earned his Ph.D. from Washington University in St. Louis in 1966, under the supervision of Jun-Ichi Hano.

He became an instructor and then lecturer at the University of California, Berkeley. At Rutgers University he became in 1969 an assistant professor, in 1970 an associate professor, in 1972 a full professor, and in 1986 the Hermann Weyl Professor of Mathematics. In 1989 he became a professor at the University of California, San Diego, where he is now a professor emeritus. From 1997 to 2003 he was an associate editor of the Annals of Mathematics and from 1996 to 1998 an associate editor of the Bulletin of the American Mathematical Society.

Wallach was a Sloan Fellow from 1972 to 1974. In 1978 he was an Invited Speaker with talk The spectrum of compact quotients of semisimple Lie groups at the International Congress of Mathematicians in Helsinki. He was elected in 2004 a Fellow of the American Academy of Arts and Sciences and in 2012 a Fellow of the American Mathematical Society. His doctoral students include AMS Fellow Alvany Rocha. He has supervised more than 18 Ph.D. theses. Besides representation theory, Wallach has also published more than 150 papers in the fields of algebraic geometry, combinatorics, differential equations, harmonic analysis, number theory, quantum information theory, Riemannian geometry, and ring theory.

== Selected publications ==
=== Articles ===
- with Michel Cahen: Lorentzian symmetric spaces, Bull. Amer. Math. Soc., vol. 76, no. 3, 1970, pp. 585–591. MR 0267500 doi:10.1090/S0002-9904-1970-12448-X
- with M. do Carmo: Minimal immersions of spheres into spheres, Annals of Mathematics, vol. 93, 1971, pp. 43–62. JSTOR 1970752
- Compact homogeneous Riemannian manifolds with strictly positive curvature, Annals of Mathematics, vol. 96, 1972, pp. 277–295. doi:10.2307/1970789
- with S. Aloff: An infinite number of distinct 7-manifolds admitting positively curved Riemannian structures, Bull. Amer. Math. Soc., vol. 81, 1975, pp. 93–97 MR 0370624 doi:10.1090/S0002-9904-1975-13649-4
- with D. DeGeorge: Limit formulas for multiplicities in L^{2}(Γ \G), Annals of Mathematics, vol. 107, 1978, pp. 133–150. doi:10.2307/1971140
- with Roe Goodman: Classical and quantum mechanical systems of Toda lattice type, 3 Parts, Comm. Math. Phys., Part I, vol. 83, 1982, pp. 355–386, MR 0649809 doi:10.1007/BF01213608; Part II, vol. 94, 1984, pp. 177–217, MR 0761793 doi:10.1007/BF01209301; Part III, vol. 105, 1986, pp. 473–509, MR 0848652 doi:10.1007/BF01205939
- with A. Rocha-Caridi: Characters of irreducible representations of the Lie algebra of vector fields on the circle, Invent. Math., vol. 72, 1983, pp. 57–75 doi:10.1007/BF01389129
- with A. Rocha-Caridi: Highest weight modules over graded Lie algebras: resolutions, filtrations and character formulas, Transactions of the American Mathematical Society, vol. 277, 1983, pp. 133–162 MR 0690045 doi:10.1090/S0002-9947-1983-0690045-3
- with T. Enright, R. Howe: A classification of unitary highest weight modules, in: Representation theory of reductive groups (Park City, Utah 1982), Progress in Mathematics 40, Birkhäuser 1983, pp. 97–143 doi:10.1007/978-1-4684-6730-7_7
- with A. Rocha-Caridi: Characters of irreducible representations of the Virasoro-Algebra, Mathematische Zeitschrift, vol. 185, 1984, pp. 1–21
- Invariant differential operators on a reductive Lie algebra and Weyl group representations, J. Amer. Math. Soc., vol. 6, no. 4, 1993, pp. 779–816. doi:10.2307/2152740
- Quantum computing and entanglement for mathematicians, in: Representation theory and complex analysis, pp. 345–376, Lecture Notes in Math. No. 1931, Springer 2008 doi:10.1007/978-3-540-76892-0_6
- with G. Gour: Classification of multipartite entanglement of all finite dimensionality, Phys. Rev. Lett., vol. 111, 2013, 060502 doi:10.1103/PhysRevLett.111.060502

=== Books ===
- Harmonic analysis on homogeneous spaces, New York: Marcel Dekker 1973
- Symplectic geometry and Fourier analysis, Brookline: Math. Science Press 1977
- Real Reductive Groups, 2 vols., Academic Press 1988, 1992
- with Roe Goodman: Representations and invariants of the classical groups, Cambridge University Press 1998; 1st pbk edition, 1999; reprint with corrections, 2003
- with Armand Borel: Continuous cohomology, discrete subgroups and representations of reductive groups, Annals of Mathematics Studies 94, 1980, 2nd edition, American Mathematical Society 2013
- with Roe Goodman: Symmetry, representations, and invariants, Graduate Texts in Mathematics, Springer 2009
- Geometric Invariant Theory: Over the Real and Complex Numbers, Universitext, Springer 2017
