= Chua Tat-Seng =

Singaporean computer scientist

Tat-Seng Chua
- Education: University of Leeds
- Occupations: Computer scientist; academic; entrepreneur
- Organizations: National University of Singapore; ViSenze; 6Estates
- Known for: Multimedia information retrieval; Recommender systems
- Awards: ACM SIGMM Technical Achievements Award (2015); CCF Overseas Outstanding Contribution Award (2024); Fellow of the Singapore National Academy of Science (2024)

Tat-Seng Chua is a Singaporean computer scientist known for his research in multimedia information retrieval, social media analytics and recommender systems. He is the Kwan Im Thong Hood Cho Temple (KITHCT) Chair Professor at the School of Computing, National University of Singapore (NUS), and was the school's founding dean from 1998 to 2000. He is also director of NExT, a joint research centre between NUS and Tsinghua University.

== Education ==
Chua received a BSc in civil engineering and computer science in 1979 and a PhD in computer science in 1983, both from the University of Leeds.

== Career and honours ==
Chua's research covers unstructured multimodal data analytics, multimodal foundation models, responsible AI, and conversational search and recommendation. His work on neural graph collaborative filtering and knowledge-graph attention networks for recommendation is among the most cited in the field, and his group received an Outstanding Paper Award at ICLR 2025 for AlphaEdit. He received the ACM SIGMM Technical Achievements Award in 2015 and the China Computer Federation Overseas Outstanding Technical Contributions Award in 2024, and is a Fellow of the Singapore National Academy of Science. He has co-founded two technology start-up companies in Singapore, including ViSenze.
