= Roger Evans Howe =

American mathematician

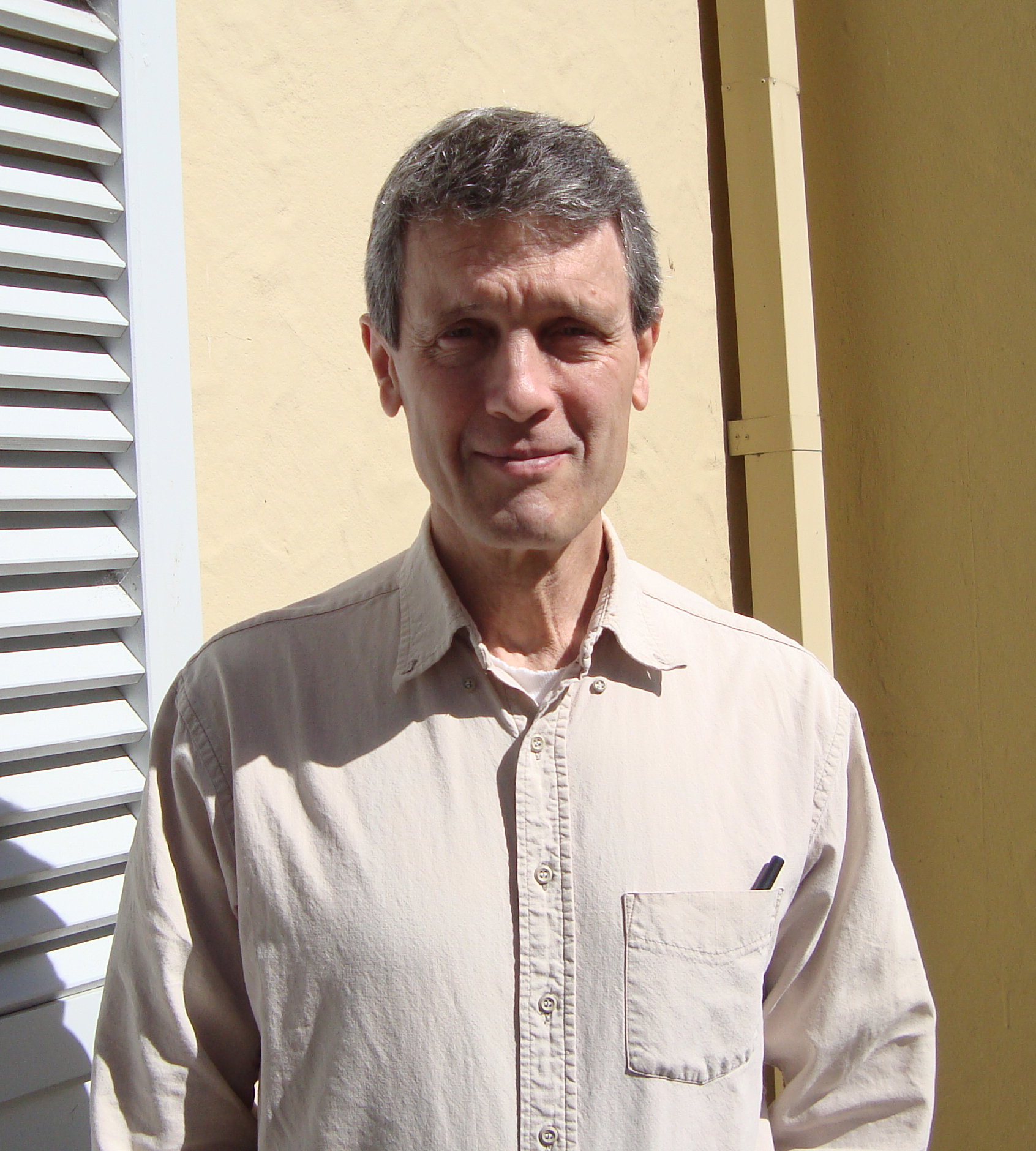
- Roger Howe in 2010
- Born: May 23, 1945 (age 81)
- Education: Harvard University; University of California, Berkeley
- Known for: Representation theory
- Awards: NAS Member (1994); AAAS Fellow (1993): William Lowell Putnam Mathematical Competition; Lester R. Ford Award
- Scientific career
- Fields: Mathematics
- Workplaces: State University of New York in Stony Brook; Yale University; Texas A&M University
- Thesis: On representations of nilpotent groups (1969)
- Doctoral advisor: Calvin C. Moore
- Doctoral students: Ju-Lee Kim; Jian-Shu Li; Zeev Rudnick; Eng-Chye Tan; Chen-Bo Zhu
- Website: directory.cehd.tamu.edu/view.epl?nid=rogerhowe

Roger Evans Howe (born May 23, 1945) is the William R. Kenan, Jr. Professor Emeritus of Mathematics at Yale University, and Curtis D. Robert Endowed Chair in Mathematics Education at Texas A&M University. He is known for his contributions to representation theory, in particular for the notion of a reductive dual pair and the Howe correspondence, and his contributions to mathematics education.

== Biography ==
He attended Ithaca High School, then Harvard University as an undergraduate, becoming a Putnam Fellow in 1964. He obtained his Ph.D. from University of California, Berkeley, in 1969. His thesis, titled On representations of nilpotent groups, was written under the supervision of Calvin Moore. Between 1969 and 1974, Howe taught at the State University of New York in Stony Brook before joining the Yale faculty in 1974. His doctoral students include Ju-Lee Kim, Jian-Shu Li, Zeev Rudnick, Eng-Chye Tan, and Chen-Bo Zhu. He moved to Texas A&M University in 2015.

He has been a fellow of the American Academy of Arts and Sciences since 1993, and a member of the National Academy of Sciences since 1994.

Howe received a Lester R. Ford Award in 1984. In 2006 he was awarded the American Mathematical Society Distinguished Public Service Award in recognition of his "multifaceted contributions to mathematics and to mathematics education." In 2012 he became a fellow of the American Mathematical Society. In 2015 he received Texas A&M University's inaugural Award for Excellence in Mathematics Education. In 2022, he received the Mary P. Dolciani Award from the Mathematical Association of America.

A conference in his honor was held at the National University of Singapore in 2006, and at Yale University in 2015.

== Selected works ==
- 1977: "Tamely ramified supercuspidal representations of $Gl_n$", Pacific Journal of Mathematics 73(2): 437–460.
- 1979: (with Calvin C. Moore) "Asymptotic properties of unitary representations", Journal of Functional Analysis 32(1): 72–96.
- 1979: "θ-series and invariant theory", in Automorphic forms, Representations and L-functions, Proceedings of Symposium on Pure Mathematics XXXIII, American Mathematical Society, pages 275–285.
- 1981: "Wave front sets of representations of Lie groups". Automorphic forms, Representation theory and Arithmetic (Bombay, 1979), pp. 117–140, Studies in Mathematics 10, Tata Institute of Fundamental Research
- 1982: "On a notion of rank for unitary representations of the classical groups". Harmonic analysis and group representations, 223–331, Liguori, Naples, 1982.
- Howe, Roger (1989), "Remarks on classical invariant theory", Transactions of the American Mathematical Society, 313 (2): 539–570, doi:10.2307/2001418, ISSN 0002-9947, JSTOR 2001418, MR 0986027
- Howe, Roger (1989), "Transcending classical invariant theory", Journal of the American Mathematical Society, 2 (3): 535–552, doi:10.1090/S0894-0347-1989-0985172-6
- 1995: "Perspectives on invariant theory: Schur duality, multiplicity-free actions and beyond". The Schur lectures (1992) (Tel Aviv), 1–182, Israel Math. Conf. Proc., 8, Bar-Ilan University, Ramat Gan.
- 1992: (with Eng-Chye Tan) Nonabelian harmonic analysis. Applications of SL(2,R), Universitext. Springer-Verlag, ISBN 0-387-97768-6.
- 2007: (with William Barker) Continuous Symmetry: From Euclid to Klein, American Mathematical Society, ISBN 978-0-8218-3900-3.
  - Robin Hartshorne (2011) Review of Continuous Symmetry, American Mathematical Monthly 118:565–8.

== See also ==
- Oscillator semigroup
