= Zeev Rudnick =

Israeli mathematician

- זאב רודניק
- Zeev Rudnick
- Born: 1961 (age 64–65); Haifa, Israel
- Education: Yale University; Hebrew University of Jerusalem; Bar-Ilan University
- Awards: Erdős Prize (2001); Fellow of the American Mathematical Society (2012)
- Scientific career
- Fields: Mathematics
- Workplaces: Tel Aviv University
- Doctoral advisor: Ilya Piatetski-Shapiro; Roger Evans Howe

Zeev Rudnick or Ze'ev Rudnick (Hebrew: זאב רודניק; born 1961 in Haifa, Israel) is a mathematician, specializing in number theory and in mathematical physics, notably quantum chaos. Rudnick is a professor at the School of Mathematical Sciences and the Cissie and Aaron Beare Chair in Number Theory at Tel Aviv University.

== Education ==
Rudnick received his PhD from Yale University in 1990 under the supervision of Ilya Piatetski-Shapiro and Roger Evans Howe.

== Career ==
Rudnick joined Tel Aviv University in 1995, after working as an assistant professor at Princeton and Stanford. In 2003–04 Rudnick was a Leverhulme visiting professor at the University of Bristol and in 2008–2010 and 2015–2016 he was a member of the Institute for Advanced Study at Princeton.

In 2012, Rudnick was inducted as a fellow of the American Mathematical Society.

== Research ==
Rudnick has been studying different aspects of quantum chaos and number theory. He has contributed to one of the discoveries concerning the Riemann zeta function, namely, that the Riemann zeros appear to display the same statistics as those which are believed to be present in energy levels of quantum chaotic systems and described by random matrix theory. Together with Peter Sarnak, he has formulated the Quantum Unique Ergodicity conjectures for eigenfunctions on negatively curved manifolds, and has investigated the question arising from Quantum Chaos in other arithmetic models such as the Quantum Cat map (with Par Kurlberg) and the flat torus (with CP Hughes and with Jean Bourgain). Another interest is the interface between function field arithmetic and corresponding problems in number fields.

== Education ==
- Ph.D., 1990, Yale University.
- M.Sc., 1985, The Hebrew University, Jerusalem.
- B.Sc., 1984, Bar-Ilan University, Ramat Gan.

== Awards and fellowships ==
- ERC Advanced Grants, 1.7 million euro, 2013–2018., 2019–2024.
- Fellow of the American Mathematical Society, 2012–.
- Annales Henri Poincaré Distinguished Paper Award for the year, 2011.
- Erdős Prize of the Israel Mathematical Union, 2001.
- Alon Fellow, 1995.
- Sloan Foundation Doctoral Dissertation Fellowship, 1989–1990.

== Selected works ==
- Duke, William; Rudnick, Zeev; Sarnak, Peter (1993). "Density of integer points on affine homogeneous varieties". Duke Mathematical Journal. 71: 143–179. doi:10.1215/S0012-7094-93-07107-4. MR 1230289.
- Rudnick, Zeév; Sarnak, Peter (1994). "The behaviour of eigenstates of arithmetic hyperbolic manifolds". Communications in Mathematical Physics. 161 (1): 195–213. doi:10.1007/BF02099418. ISSN 0010-3616.
- Luo, Wenzhi; Rudnick, Zeév; Sarnak, Peter (1995). "On Selberg's Eigenvalue Conjecture". Geometries in Interaction. Basel: Birkhäuser Basel. doi:10.1007/978-3-0348-9102-8_9. ISBN 978-3-0348-9907-9.
- Rudnick, Zeév; Sarnak, Peter (1 January 1996). "Zeros of principal L-functions and random matrix theory". Duke Mathematical Journal. 81 (2). doi:10.1215/S0012-7094-96-08115-6. ISSN 0012-7094.
- Kurlberg, Pär; Rudnick, Zeév (15 May 2000). "Hecke theory and equidistribution for the quantization of linear maps of the torus". Duke Mathematical Journal. 103 (1). arXiv:chao-dyn/9901031. doi:10.1215/S0012-7094-00-10314-6. ISSN 0012-7094.
- Rudnick, Z.; Soundararajan, K. (10 May 2005). "Lower bounds for moments of L -functions". Proceedings of the National Academy of Sciences. 102 (19): 6837–6838. doi:10.1073/pnas.0501723102. ISSN 0027-8424. PMC 1100781. PMID 15867148.
- Z. Rudnick, What is Quantum Chaos?, Notices of the AMS, 55 number 1 (2008), 32–34.
- Bourgain, Jean; Rudnick, Zeév (1 October 2009). "Restriction of toral eigenfunctions to hypersurfaces". Comptes Rendus. Mathématique. 347 (21–22): 1249–1253. arXiv:0907.4824. doi:10.1016/j.crma.2009.08.008. ISSN 1631-073X.
- Keating, Jonathan P.; Rudnick, Zeév (2014). "The Variance of the Number of Prime Polynomials in Short Intervals and in Residue Classes". International Mathematics Research Notices. 2014 (1): 259–288. arXiv:1204.0708. doi:10.1093/imrn/rns220. ISSN 1687-0247.
- Entin, Alexei; Roditty-Gershon, Edva; Rudnick, Zeév (2013). "Low-lying Zeros of Quadratic Dirichlet L-Functions, Hyper-elliptic Curves and Random Matrix Theory". Geometric and Functional Analysis. 23 (4): 1230–1261. arXiv:1208.5962. doi:10.1007/s00039-013-0241-8. ISSN 1016-443X.
