= Sun Binyong =

Chinese mathematician

- 孙斌勇
- Born: November 1976 (age 49); Zhoushan, Zhejiang, China
- Education: Zhejiang University (BS); Hong Kong University of Science and Technology (PhD)
- Scientific career
- Fields: Mathematics
- Workplaces: Institute of Mathematics and Systems Sciences, Chinese Academy of Sciences (CAS); Swiss Federal Institute of Technology Zurich
- Thesis: Matrix coefficients and representations of real reductive groups (2004)
- Doctoral advisor: Li Jianshu

Chinese name
- Traditional Chinese: 孫斌勇
- Simplified Chinese: 孙斌勇
Transcriptions
Standard Mandarin
- Hanyu Pinyin: Sun Binyong

Sun Binyong (Chinese: 孙斌勇; born November 1976) is a Chinese mathematician. He is an academician of the Chinese Academy of Sciences (CAS).

== Early life and education ==
Sun was born in Putuo District, Zhoushan, Zhejiang in November 1976, the second of three sons. His mother Liu Yadi (刘雅娣) is a housewife. His father Sun Kaizhu (孙开柱) was a carpenter. He attended Shuangtang Middle School, Putuo Middle School and the High School attached to Tsinghua University. After high school, he entered Zhejiang University, where he graduated in 1999. In December 2004, he earned his Ph.D. from the Hong Kong University of Science and Technology under the supervision of Li Jianshu.

== Career ==
From January to September 2005 he was a postdoctoral researcher at the Swiss Federal Institute of Technology Zurich in Switzerland. In September 2005 he became research associate at the Institute of Mathematics and Systems Sciences, Chinese Academy of Sciences (CAS), and was promoted to researcher in 2011.

== Personal life ==
Sun is married and has two daughters.

== Honours and awards ==
- 2014 Chen Jiageng Youth Science Award
- June 2, 2016 Young Scientist Award of Chinese Academy of Sciences
- August 14, 2018 State Natural Science Award (Second Class)
- November 22, 2019 Academician of the Chinese Academy of Sciences (CAS)
- 2025 Asian Scientist 100
