= Li Jianshu =

Chinese mathematician

- Born: 1959 (age 66–67); Xiaoshan, Zhejiang, China
- Education: Zhejiang University (BS); Yale University (PhD)
- Awards: Sloan Research Fellowship (1992)
- Scientific career
- Fields: Mathematics
- Workplaces: Institute for Advanced Study in Mathematics (Zhejiang University); Hong Kong University of Science and Technology; University of Maryland, College Park; Massachusetts Institute of Technology
- Thesis: Theta series and distinguished representations for symplectic groups (1987)
- Doctoral advisor: Roger Evans Howe
- Doctoral students: Sun Binyong

Li Jianshu (simplified Chinese: 励建书; traditional Chinese: 勵建書; born 1959), also known as Jian-Shu Li, is a Chinese mathematician working in representation theory and automorphic forms. He is the founding director of the Institute for Advanced Study in Mathematics at Zhejiang University and Professor Emeritus at the Hong Kong University of Science and Technology.

== Early life and education ==
Li was born in Xiaoshan, Zhejiang, China. He graduated from Xiaoshan Middle School. Li studied mathematics at the Department of Mathematics at Zhejiang University. He obtained his Ph.D. in mathematics from Yale University under the supervision of Roger Evans Howe in 1987.

== Career ==
Li was a Moore Instructor at the Massachusetts Institute of Technology and a professor at the University of Maryland, College Park. Li is Professor Emeritus at the Hong Kong University of Science and Technology, and has previously served as President of the Hong Kong Mathematical Society and as Chang Jiang Chair Professor of Zhejiang University.

Li is the founding director of the Institute for Advanced Study in Mathematics at Zhejiang University.

== Awards and honors ==
Li was a recipient of a Sloan Research Fellowship in 1992 and an invited speaker at the International Congress of Mathematicians (ICM) in 1994 (Section: Lie Groups). He has been a member of the Chinese Academy of Sciences (CAS) since 2013.

== Selected works ==
- Li, Jian-Shu (1989). "Singular unitary representations of classical groups". Inventiones Mathematicae. 97 (2). Springer Science and Business Media LLC: 237–255. Bibcode:1989InMat..97..237L. doi:10.1007/bf01389041. ISSN 0020-9910. S2CID 119910904.
- "Non-vanishing theorems for the cohomology of certain arithmetic quotients". Journal für die reine und angewandte Mathematik (Crelle's Journal). 1992 (428). Walter de Gruyter GmbH: 177–217. 1 June 1992. doi:10.1515/crll.1992.428.177. ISSN 0075-4102. S2CID 116142708.
- Li, Jian-Shu (1 December 1990). "Theta lifting for unitary representations with nonzero cohomology". Duke Mathematical Journal. 61 (3). Duke University Press. doi:10.1215/s0012-7094-90-06135-6. ISSN 0012-7094.
- "On the classification of irreducible low rank unitary representations of classical groups", Compositio Math. 71 (1989), no. 1, 29–48.
- Burger, M.; Li, J. S.; Sarnak, P. (1 April 1992). "Ramanujan duals and automorphic spectrum". Bulletin of the American Mathematical Society. 26 (2). American Mathematical Society (AMS): 253–258. arXiv:math/9204229. doi:10.1090/s0273-0979-1992-00267-7. ISSN 0273-0979. S2CID 6054562.
