= National University of Singapore =

Public research university in Queenstown, Singapore

- Universiti Nasional Singapura (Malay) 新加坡国立大学 (Chinese) சிங்கப்பூர் தேசிய பல்கலைக்கழகம் (Tamil)
- Coat of arms
- Former names: Straits Settlements and Federated Malay States Government Medical School (1905–1921); King Edward VII College of Medicine (1921–1949); University of Malaya, Singapore campus (1949–1962); University of Singapore (1962–1980); Nanyang University (1956–1980)
- Type: Public research university
- Established: 3 July 1905; 121 years ago (as King Edward VII College of Medicine); 8 August 1980; 46 years ago (as National University of Singapore)
- Academic affiliations: ACU, IARU, APRU, Universitas 21, GEM4, AUN, ASAIHL, APSIA, UAiTED
- Endowment: S$6.33 billion (2024) (US$4.9 billion)
- Chancellor: President of Singapore
- President: Tan Eng Chye
- Provost: Aaron Thean
- Academic staff: 2,555 (2018)
- Students: 35,908 (2018)
- Undergraduates: 27,604
- Postgraduates: 8,304
- Location: Queenstown, Singapore; 1°17′44″N 103°46′36″E
- Campus: Urban, 150 ha (370 acres)
- Colours: Safety orange, cerulean
- Website: nus.edu.sg

The National University of Singapore (NUS) is a national public research university in Singapore. It was officially established in 1980 through the government-directed merger of the public University of Singapore and the private Nanyang University.

The university offers degree programmes in disciplines at both the undergraduate and postgraduate levels, including in the sciences, medicine and dentistry, design and environment, law, arts and social sciences, engineering, business, computing, and music. NUS's main campus is located adjacent to the Kent Ridge subzone of Queenstown. The Duke–NUS Medical School is located at the Outram campus. The Bukit Timah campus houses the Lee Kuan Yew School of Public Policy. NUS's affiliated faculty members, researchers, and alumni include one Nobel Prize laureate, one Tang Prize laureate, one Vautrin Lud Prize laureate, two Ramon Magsaysay awardees, two Singapore prime ministers, four Singapore presidents, and two Malaysian prime ministers.

== History ==
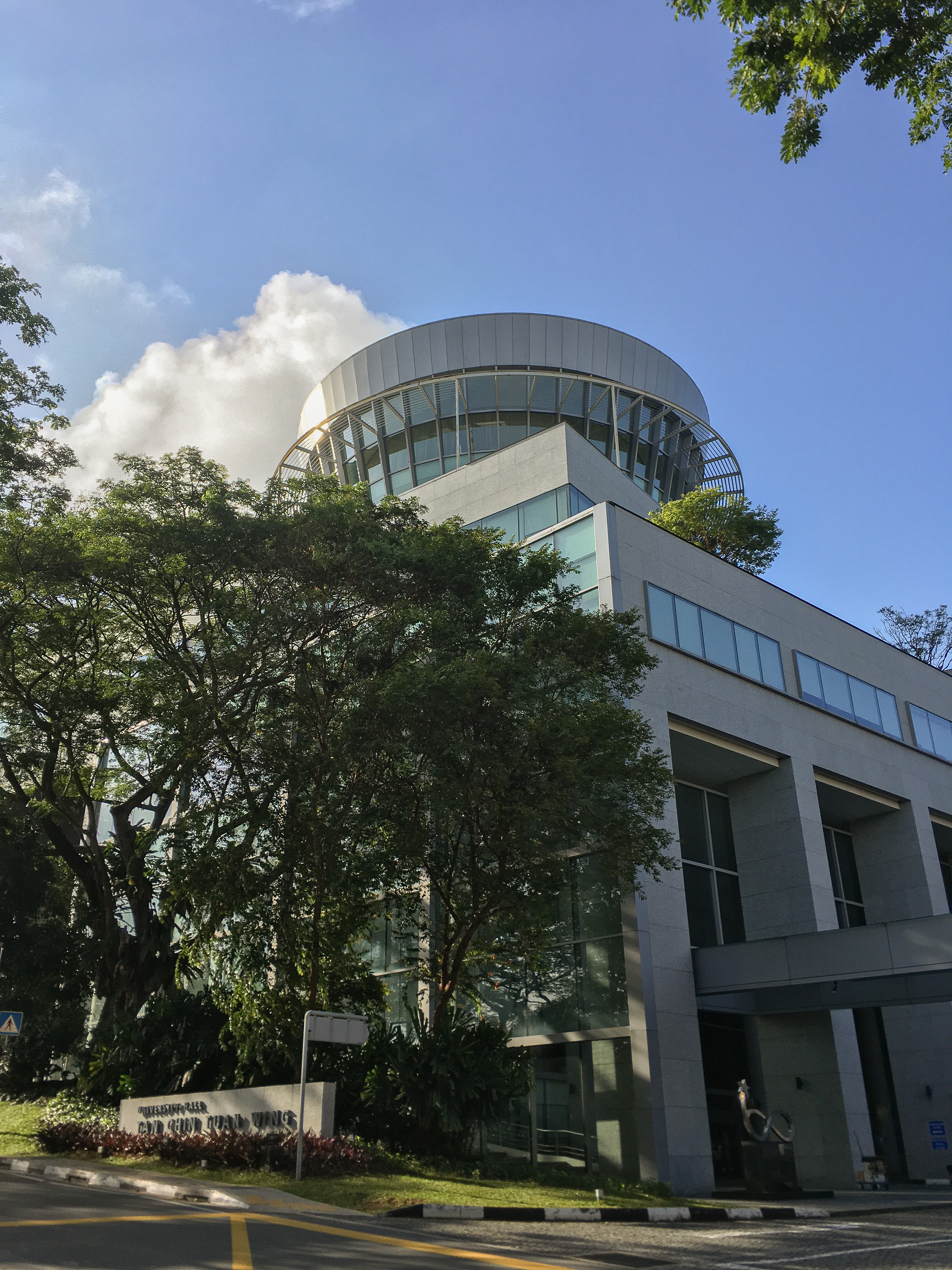
University Hall

In September 1904, Tan Jiak Kim led a group of representatives of the Chinese and other non-European communities to petition the governor of the Straits Settlements, Sir John Anderson, to establish a medical school in Singapore. It was noted by Anderson that there were other petitions prior which were not successful due to concerns over having a sufficient number of students and support from the local community. Tan, who was the first president of the Straits Chinese British Association, managed to raise 87,077 Straits dollars from the community, including a personal donation of $12,000. On 3 July 1905, the medical school was founded and was known as the Straits Settlements and Federated Malay States Government Medical School. At Anderson's directions, the school was hosted temporarily at a recently emptied block at a Government-run asylum in Pasir Panjang while providing the staff required to run the school.

In 1912, the medical school received an endowment of $120,000 from the King Edward VII Memorial Fund, started by physician Lim Boon Keng. Subsequently, on 18 November 1913, the name of the school was changed to King Edward VII Medical School. In 1921, it was again changed to King Edward VII College of Medicine to reflect its academic status.

In 1928, Raffles College was set up as a college for higher education in the arts and sciences.

=== University of Malaya in Singapore (1949–1962) ===
On 8 October 1949, Raffles College was merged with King Edward VII College of Medicine to form the University of Malaya. The two institutions were merged to provide for the higher education needs of the Federation of Malaya.

The growth of University of Malaya was very rapid during the first decade of its establishment and resulted in the setting up of two autonomous divisions in 1959, one located in Singapore and the other in Kuala Lumpur.

=== Nanyang University (1955–1980) ===
In 1955, Nanyang University (abbreviated Nan-tah, 南大) was established on the backdrop of the Chinese community in Singapore.

=== University of Singapore (1962–1980) ===
In 1960, the governments of then Federation of Malaya and Singapore indicated their desire to change the status of the divisions into that of a national university. Legislation was passed in 1961, establishing the former Kuala Lumpur division as the University of Malaya, while the Singapore division was renamed the University of Singapore on 1 January 1962.

=== Present form ===
The National University of Singapore (NUS) was formed with the merger of the University of Singapore and Nanyang University on 6 August 1980. This was done in part due to the government's desire to pool the two institutions' resources into a single, stronger entity and promote English as Singapore's main language of education. The original crest of Nanyang University with three intertwined rings was incorporated into the new coat-of-arms of NUS.

Most departments of the university were situated at the Bukit Timah campus, with the gradual shift to the Kent Ridge site starting in 1969 and completed in 1986. NUS began its entrepreneurial education endeavours in the 1980s, with the setting up of the Centre for Management of Innovation and Technopreneurship in 1988. In 2001, this was renamed the NUS Entrepreneurship Centre (NEC), and became a division of NUS Enterprise. NEC is currently headed by Wong Poh Kam.

NUS has 17 faculties and schools across three campus locations in Singapore – Kent Ridge, Bukit Timah and Outram. NUS also collaborates with many other universities around the world, such as Harvard University, Yale University, UCLA, and Georgia Institute of Technology.

NUS has a diverse range of students and faculty stemming from distinct foreign nationalities. 65% of faculty and staff are foreign nationals, ranking it 3rd (tied with Nanyang Technological University) in terms of foreign representation among faculty across the top 100 universities according to QS. It remains one of the few top 100 universities with more than 60% of foreign faculty. Likewise, 36% or 12,057 of students are foreign nationals, with 62% them being post-graduate students.

In 2025, NUS celebrated several milestones. The university commemorated its 120th anniversary, together with the Yong Loo Lin School of Medicine. NUS Engineering celebrated its 70th anniversary, while the Duke-NUS Medical School and the NUS High School marked their 20th anniversary. For its 120th anniversary, NUS organised a year-long lineup of events including a Distinguished Speaker Series, gathering experts from around the world to talk about pressing issues of the future. Notable speakers included AI experts Professors Yann LeCun and Yoshua Bengio.

== Coat of arms ==
The coat of arms of the National University of Singapore was adopted in 1980 and modernized in 2001. It is the combination of the coat of arms of the former University of Singapore used since 1962 (consisting of an open book and a lion, which itself was derived from the former coat of arms of the University of Malaya used from 1949 until 1962, which featured a tiger instead of a lion), and the emblem of the former Nanyang University, three interlocking rings but without the star used since 1955.

It is blazoned:

Argent a lion passant guardant proper; on a chief azure dexter an open book also proper, bound, edged and clasped Or and sinister three annulets interlaced one and two Argent.

The lion represents NUS as a Singaporean university, the open book represents knowledge and the three rings represents the university's role in creating, imparting and applying knowledge, as well as creativity, innovation and entrepreneurship.

The National University of Singapore is one of two public universities in Singapore to adopt its coat of arms, alongside the Nanyang Technological University, with which it has relations.

== Reputation and rankings ==
University rankings

Global – Overall
- ARWU World: 53 (2026)
- QS World: 8 (2026)
- THE World: 15 (2027)
- THE Reputation: 19 (2025)
- USNWR Global: 16 (2026)

=== Overall rankings ===
Globally, NUS was #8 in the QS World University Rankings 2026, #15 in the Times Higher Education (THE) World University Rankings 2027, #16 in the USNWR 2026-2027 Best Global Universities Rankings, #53 in the Academic Ranking of World Universities (ARWU) 2026, #25 in the SCImago Institutions Rankings 2024, and #26 in the Informatics Institute/METU's University Ranking by Academic Performance (URAP) 2022–2023.

NUS was the 22nd best-ranked university worldwide in terms of aggregate performance across THE, QS, and ARWU, as reported by ARTU 2025.

QS has ranked NUS among the world's top 15 since 2016. THE has ranked NUS among the world's top 30 since 2013. The joint THE–QS World University Rankings from 2004 to 2009 ranked NUS globally 18th (2004), 22nd (2005), 19th (2006), 33rd (2007), 30th (2008 and 2009).

NUS was 19th in the THE World Reputation Rankings 2025, and was named the world's 10th most international university by THE in 2023.

The World's Top 2% Scientists by Stanford University features numerous NUS researchers from a wide range of disciplines.

=== Subject/area rankings ===
In the 2027 QS World University Rankings released on June 18 2026, NUS ranked 10th globally.

In the 2024 QS World University Rankings by Subject, NUS ranked among the global top 10 for 19 subjects.

In the 2024 QS Global Executive MBA Rankings, NUS ranked 14th globally.

In the 2025 QS Global MBA Rankings, NUS ranked 25th globally.

In the 2026 Times Higher Education (THE) World University Rankings by Subject, NUS achieved high global ranks in several subjects, being ranked 13th in Computer Science, 10th in Engineering, 15th in Law, 10th in Business & Economics, 11th in Physical Sciences, and 16th in Social Sciences. In all subjects, NUS held the top spot nationally.

In the 2023 Academic Ranking of World Universities (ARWU) Global Ranking of Academic Subjects, NUS exhibited strong global standing, being ranked among the global top 30 in 22 subjects. In most subjects, NUS achieved a national rank of 1.

QS World University Rankings by Subject 2024
Subject	Global	National
Arts & Humanities	▲37	1
Linguistics	▲9	1
Archaeology	48	1
Architecture and Built Environment	▲5	1
Art and Design	▲ =33	1–2
Classics and Ancient History	38	1
English Language and Literature	▲16	1
History	▲11	1
Art History	▲2	1
Modern Languages	▲ =19	1
Performing Arts	▲41	1
Philosophy	▼34	1
Engineering and Technology	▲ =13	▲1
Engineering – Chemical	▲5	1
Engineering – Civil and Structural	4	1
Computer Science and Information Systems	6	1
Data Science and Artificial Intelligence	6	1
Engineering – Electrical and Electronic	▲6	▲1
Engineering – Mechanical	▲ =7	1
Engineering – Mineral and Mining	=17	1
Life Sciences & Medicine	▲ =31	1
Anatomy and Physiology	▲16	1
Biological Sciences	16	1
Dentistry	▲30	1
Medicine	▲ =18	1
Nursing	▲20	1
Pharmacy and Pharmacology	▼14	1
Psychology	▲18	1
Natural Sciences	▲29	1
Chemistry	▲7	1
Environmental Sciences	▲9	1
Geography	▼6	1
Materials Sciences	▲8	2
Mathematics	▲10	1
Physics and Astronomy	▲17	▲1
Social Sciences & Management	▲14	1
Accounting and Finance	14	1
Anthropology	▲13	1
Business and Management Studies	▲10	1
Communication and Media Studies	▼24	2
Development Studies	9	1
Economics and Econometrics	▲17	1
Law and Legal Studies	=12	1
Marketing	▲8	1
Politics	11	1
Social Policy and Administration	6	1
Sociology	▼14	1
Sports–Related Subjects	▲ =25	▲1
Statistics and Operational Research	▲ =10	1

THE World University Rankings by Subject 2024
Subject	Global	National
Arts & humanities	▲26	1
Business & economics	▼15	1
Clinical & health	▼ =16	1
Computer science	▼11	1
Engineering	▼9	1
Law	▼11	1
Life sciences	▲22	1
Physical sciences	▲ =12	1
Psychology	▼ =64	1
Social sciences	▲16	1

ARWU Global Ranking of Academic Subjects 2023
Subject	Global	National
Natural Sciences
Mathematics	▼76–100	1
Physics	▲76–100	1–2
Chemistry	▼22	2
Earth Sciences	201–300	2
Geography	▲8	1
Ecology	▲76–100	1
Oceanography	▲101–150	1
Atmospheric Science	151–200	1
Engineering
Mechanical Engineering	▲44	2
Electrical & Electronic Engineering	▼17	2
Automation & Control	▼49	2
Telecommunication Engineering	▼16	▼2
Instruments Science & Technology	▼37	2
Biomedical Engineering	▲11	1
Computer Science & Engineering	▲12	2
Civil Engineering	▲20	▲1
Chemical Engineering	▼23	1
Materials Science & Engineering	▲13	2
Nanoscience & Nanotechnology	▼7	2
Energy Science & Engineering	▼19	2
Environmental Science & Engineering	▼51–75	1–2
Water Resources	▲51–75	1–2
Food Science & Technology	▲17	1
Biotechnology	▼27	1
Aerospace Engineering	▼29	1
Marine/Ocean Engineering	▼24	1
Transportation Science & Technology	▼16	▼2
Remote Sensing	51–75	1
Metallurgical Engineering	76–100	2
Life Sciences
Biological Sciences	51–75	1
Human Biological Sciences	51–75	1
Agricultural Sciences	▼301–400	1
Medical Sciences
Clinical Medicine	▲51–75	1
Public Health	▲33	1
Dentistry & Oral Sciences	▲51–75	1
Nursing	▲11	1
Medical Technology	101–150	1
Pharmacy & Pharmaceutical Sciences	▼21	1
Social Sciences
Economics	▲24	1
Statistics	▲20	1
Law	▲151–200	1
Political Sciences	101–150	1
Sociology	▲51–75	1
Education	▲151–200	2
Communication	▲41	2
Psychology	76–100	1
Business Administration	51–75	1
Finance	▲51–75	▲2–3
Management	2	1
Public Administration	▲27	1
Hospitality & Tourism Management	201–300	2
Library & Information Science	▼11	1

NUS's performance in the Business School Rankings by Financial Times:

FT Subject	Year	NUS's world rank	Ranked Entity
EMBA	2026	11	UCLA: Anderson/National University of Singapore
EMBA	2026	9	National University of Singapore Business School
MBA	2026	29	National University of Singapore Business School

=== Graduate employability rankings ===
NUS graduates ranked 8th worldwide in the Times Higher Education's Global University Employability Ranking 2027. NUS graduates also ranked 9th according to the Global Employability University Ranking and Survey (GEURS) 2025.

== Academic structure ==
NUS has a semester-based modular system for conducting undergraduate courses. It adopts features of the British system, such as small group teaching (tutorials) on top of regular two-hour lectures, and the American system (course credits). NUS has 17 faculties and schools across three campuses, including a music conservatory.

=== University Scholars Programme ===
The University Scholars Programme (USP) was an undergraduate academic programme established in 2001 in NUS, which comprised a compulsory general education programme. USP admitted 240 undergraduates annually. USP students resided in Cinnamon College at the NUS University Town. This programme has since merged with Yale-NUS to become the NUS College.

=== NUS College ===
A modernized version of the University Scholars Programme, the NUS College today serves as the university's honors college, with a more rigorous application and a focus on global citizenship. The NUS College program notably involves foreign, service-based exchange around South-East Asia, guided by their core ideal that "Learning is a contact sport."

== Faculties and schools ==
=== Business ===
The NUS Business School was founded as the Department of Business Administration in 1965. Today, the school has over 280 faculty members and 7,000 students.

=== Computing ===
The School of Computing established in 1998, has two departments: Computer Science; and Information Systems and Analytics. Its founding dean was Chua Tat-Seng, who served from 1998 to 2000.

=== Dentistry ===
The Faculty of Dentistry traces its origins in 1929 as a Department of Dentistry within the King Edward VII College of Medicine. The faculty conducts a four-year dental course leading to a Bachelor of Dental Surgery degree.

=== Design and Engineering ===
The interdisciplinary College of Design and Engineering (CDE) was established in 2021, bringing together two pre-existing faculties, the School of Design and Environment (SDE) and the Faculty of Engineering (FoE).

The School of Design and Environment has three departments: Department of Architecture; Department of the Built Environment; and the Division of Industrial Design. The Faculty of Engineering was established in 1968. It is the largest faculty in the university, and consists of several departments spanning diverse engineering fields.

=== Humanities and Sciences ===
The interdisciplinary College of Humanities and Sciences (CHS) was established in 2020. It comprises the two largest faculties, the Faculty of Arts and Social Sciences, and the Faculty of Science, though both faculties are still branded independently, unlike CDE.

The Faculty of Arts and Social Sciences has roots in Raffles College. Initially offering just four subjects: English, History, Geography and Economics, the Faculty now offers majors, minors and special programmes across 16 Departments. This includes the Centre for Language Studies, which teaches 13 different languages, and the Office of Programmes, which houses multidisciplinary fields and minor programmes. The South Asian Studies Programme is not officially classified as a department, but as a departmental entity.

The Faculty of Science comprises multiple departments, spanning across natural and applied sciences. The first female Dean of the Faculty of Science was Gloria Lim, who was appointed in 1973. She served a four-year term and was reappointed in 1979, but resigned after one year to allow Koh Lip Lin to continue his post. In 1980, University of Singapore merged with Nanyang University to form NUS, resulting in overlapping posts.

=== Integrative Sciences and Engineering ===
The NUS Graduate School for Integrative Sciences and Engineering (NGS) was established in 2003. The principal purpose of NGS is "to promote integrative PhD research encompassing both laboratory work and coursework programmes which not only transcend traditional subject boundaries but also provides students with a depth of experience about science and the way it is carried out."

=== Law ===
The NUS Faculty of Law was first established as a Department of Law in the University of Malaya in 1956. The first law students were admitted to the Bukit Timah campus of the university the following year. In 1980, the faculty shifted to the Kent Ridge campus, but in 2006 it relocated back to the Bukit Timah site. The faculty was relocated to the Kent Ridge campus at the start of 2026, sharing the former Yale-NUS campus with NUS College.

The faculty offers LLB, LLM, JD, and PhD programmes, alongside continuing education and graduate certificate programmes.

=== Medicine ===
The Yong Loo Lin School of Medicine at NUS was first established as the Straits Settlements and Federated Malay States Government Medical School in 1905. The School uses the British undergraduate medical system, offering a full-time undergraduate programme leading to a Bachelor of Medicine and Bachelor of Surgery (MBBS). For Nursing, the Bachelor of Science (Nursing) conducted by the Alice Lee Centre for Nursing Studies is offered. The department also offers postgraduate programmes in nursing, medicine, and medical science.

=== Duke–NUS Medical School ===
The Duke–NUS Medical School (Duke–NUS) is a graduate medical school in Singapore. The school was set up in April 2005 as the Duke–NUS Graduate Medical School, Singapore's second medical school, after the Yong Loo Lin School of Medicine, and before the Lee Kong Chian School of Medicine. The Duke–NUS Medical School is a collaboration between Duke University in North Carolina, United States and the National University of Singapore.

=== Music ===
The Yong Siew Toh Conservatory of Music (YSTCM) is a collaboration between NUS and the Peabody Institute of Johns Hopkins University. Singapore's first conservatory of music, YSTCM was founded as the Singapore Conservatory of Music in 2001. The School was renamed Yong Siew Toh Conservatory of Music after a gift was made by the family of the late Dr Yong Loo Lin in memory of his daughter.

=== Public health ===
The Saw Swee Hock School of Public Health is Singapore's first and only tertiary education institution for public health. The school traces its origins to the University of Malaya's Department of Social Medicine and Public Health, formed in 1948. The School of Public health also hosts the Asia Centre for Health Security.

=== Public Policy ===
The Lee Kuan Yew School of Public Policy was established in 2004 as an autonomous graduate school of NUS. Although the School was formally launched in 2004, it inherited NUS's Public Policy Programme, which was established in 1992 in partnership with Harvard University's Kennedy School of Government.

=== Yale-NUS College ===
The Yale-NUS College was a liberal arts college in Singapore established in August 2013 as a joint project of Yale University and the National University of Singapore. It was an autonomous college within NUS, allowing it greater freedom to develop its own policies while tapping on the existing facilities and resources of the main university. Students who graduated received a degree awarded by NUS. Pericles Lewis, a former professor at Yale, was appointed as the founding president in 2012.

In August 2021, NUS announced that it was going to merge Yale-NUS College with the University Scholars Programme to form a new honours college, NUS College, by 2025. The merger marked the dissolution of NUS' partnership with Yale University. The last class of Yale-NUS College students were admitted in 2021, following which Yale-NUS operated until 2025.

== Teaching centres ==
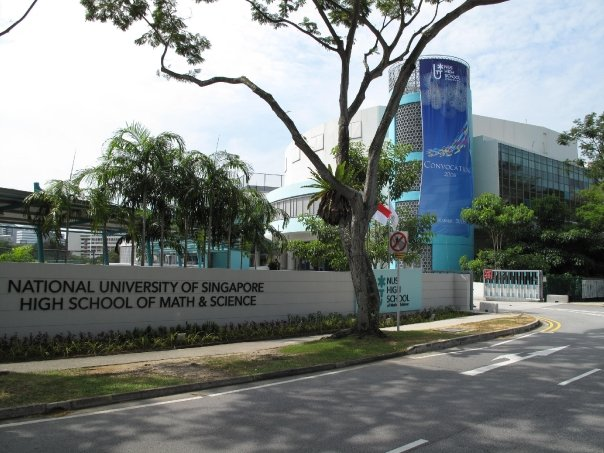
NUS High School of Mathematics and Science Campus

NUS has a variety of teaching centres including:

- Centre for Development of Teaching and Learning (CDTL)
- Centre for Instructional Technology (CIT)
- Centre for English Language Communication (CELC)
- Institute of Systems Science (ISS), which offers professional IT continuing education
- Centre for Teaching and Learning CTL at Yale-NUS College

=== NUS High School of Mathematics and Science ===
NUS High School of Mathematics and Science is a school specialising in mathematics and science, and provides secondary and pre-tertiary education to students with inclinations to these fields.

== Research ==
The major research focuses at NUS are biomedical science, physical science, engineering, nanoscience, material science, information technology, humanities, social sciences, and defence.

=== Biomedical Engineering ===
One of several niche research areas of strategic importance to Singapore being undertaken at NUS is bioengineering. Initiatives in this area include bioimaging, tissue engineering and tissue modulation.

The university has received a number of grants from the Bill & Melinda Gates Foundation for research into areas including vaccine development, water treatment, mobile devices in healthcare, iris recognition, synthetic antibodies, tuberculosis, and government response to the COVID-19 pandemic in Asia.

=== Research institutes and centres ===
Currently, NUS hosts 21 university-level research institutes and centres (RICs) in various fields. Four of these RICs have been designated Research Centres of Excellence by the Singapore government — the Cancer Science Institute of Singapore, Centre for Quantum Technologies, Mechanobiology Institute, and Institute for Functional Intelligent Materials.

Besides university-level RICs, NUS also affiliates with other universities to establish research centres and institutes. The Logistics Institute – Asia Pacific is a collaborative effort between NUS and the Georgia Institute of Technology for research and education in logistics. The Next Age Institute, a partnership with Washington University in St. Louis, is the most recent cross-university centre involving NUS, established in February 2015.

== Entrepreneurship ==
NUS began its entrepreneurial education endeavours in the 1980s, establishing the Centre for Management of Innovation and Technopreneurship in 1988. In 2001, this was renamed the NUS Entrepreneurship Centre (NEC), and became a division of NUS Enterprise, the entrepreneurial arm of NUS. Its activities include entrepreneurial education and outreach, technology commercialisation, and a business incubator.

The NUS Overseas Colleges (NOC) programme was started in 2001, giving students the opportunity to experience, live, work and study in an entrepreneurial hub. Participants of the programme either spend 6 months or a year overseas, taking courses at partner universities and working in start-ups.

The NUS Industry Liaison Office (ILO) is another department that is involved in the creation of deep tech start-ups. It manages the university's technology transfer and promotes research collaborations with industry and partners. ILO manages NUS intellectual property, commercialises its intellectual assets and facilitates the spinning off of technologies into start-up companies.

== Campus facilities and resources ==
NUS's main campus is located in the southwestern part of Singapore, adjacent to the Kent Ridge subzone of Queenstown, accommodating an area of 170 ha (420 acres). The Duke–NUS Medical School, a postgraduate medical school jointly established with Duke University, is located at the Outram campus; and its Bukit Timah campus houses the Faculty of Law and Lee Kuan Yew School of Public Policy.

== Vice-chancellors and presidents ==
Below is a list of presidents throughout the history of the National University of Singapore (and its predecessors). The office of the President of Raffles College was renamed Principal of Raffles College from 1938.

National University of Singapore
Period	President/vice chancellor/principal
2018–2027 (Note: Tan Eng Chye announced on 21 October 2026 on his intention of retirement from presidency, scheduled in end-2027.)	Tan Eng Chye
2008–2017	Tan Chorh Chuan
2000–2008	Shih Choon Fong
1981–2000	Lim Pin
1980–1981	Tony Tan Keng Yam

University of Singapore
Period	President/vice chancellor/principal
1975–1980	Kwan Sai Kheong
1968–1975	Toh Chin Chye
1963–1967	Lim Tay Boh
1962–1963	Baratham Ramaswamy Sreenivasan

University of Malaya (Singapore Division)
Period	President/vice chancellor/principal
1961–1962	Baratham Ramaswamy Sreenivasan
1960–1961	Alexander Oppenheim
1959–1960	Arthur Anantharaj Sandosham

University of Malaya
Period	President/vice chancellor/principal
1957–1962	Alexander Oppenheim
1952–1956	Sydney Caine
1949–1952	George V. Allen

Raffles College
Period	President/vice chancellor/principal
1948–1949	George V. Allen
1946–1948	W E Dyer
1938–1941	George McOwan
1937–1938	Alexander Keir
1935–1937	Frederick Joseph Morten
1932–1934	James Watson
1928–1931	Richard O Winstedt

King Edward VII College of Medicine
Period	President/vice chancellor/principal
1947–1949	Desmond William George Faris
1929–1947	George V. Allen
1918–1929	George Hugh K MacAlister
1909–1918	Robert Donald Keith
1905–1909	Gerald Dudley Freer

== Notable alumni ==
Since its inception in 1905, NUS has had many distinguished alumni from Singapore and Malaysia, including two Singapore prime ministers and four Singapore presidents, two Malaysian prime ministers, and many politicians, judiciaries, business executives, educators and local celebrities. It counts among its graduates, heads of state/government Abdul Razak Hussein, Benjamin Sheares, Goh Chok Tong, Mahathir Mohamad and S. R. Nathan. The first prime minister of Singapore, Lee Kuan Yew, attended Raffles College briefly prior to World War II.

A number of its graduates are also notable politicians such as Rais Yatim, Malaysia's former minister of information, communications and culture, Ng Eng Hen, Singapore's former minister for defence, Vivian Balakrishnan, Singapore's minister for foreign affairs, and S. Jayakumar, Singapore's former deputy prime minister.

Many of Singapore's business leaders come from NUS, including as former chairman of the Singapore Exchange, and Singapore Tourism Board Chew Choon Seng, CEO of the Hyflux Group Olivia Lum, former CEO of the Temasek Holdings Ho Ching, Chairman of SPRING Singapore Philip Yeo and CEO of Razer Inc Min-Liang Tan.

In international politics, NUS counts among its graduates former director-general of the World Health Organization Margaret Chan, former president of the United Nations Security Council Kishore Mahbubani, and vice-president of the International Olympic Committee Ng Ser Miang.

NUS had served as Singapore's only law school for half a century, until the SMU School of Law was set up in 2007. Many of Singapore's judges and lawyers come from the school. This includes Singapore's Minister for Law, and Home Affairs K. Shanmugam, the fourth Chief Justice of Singapore Sundaresh Menon and the third chief justice of Singapore Chan Sek Keong.

In academia, NUS faculty include former vice-president of finance for the University of Virginia, and Cornell University Yoke San Reynolds, and former vice-chancellor of the University of Hong Kong and Tang Prize Laureate Wang Gungwu.

Notable Alumni of NUS

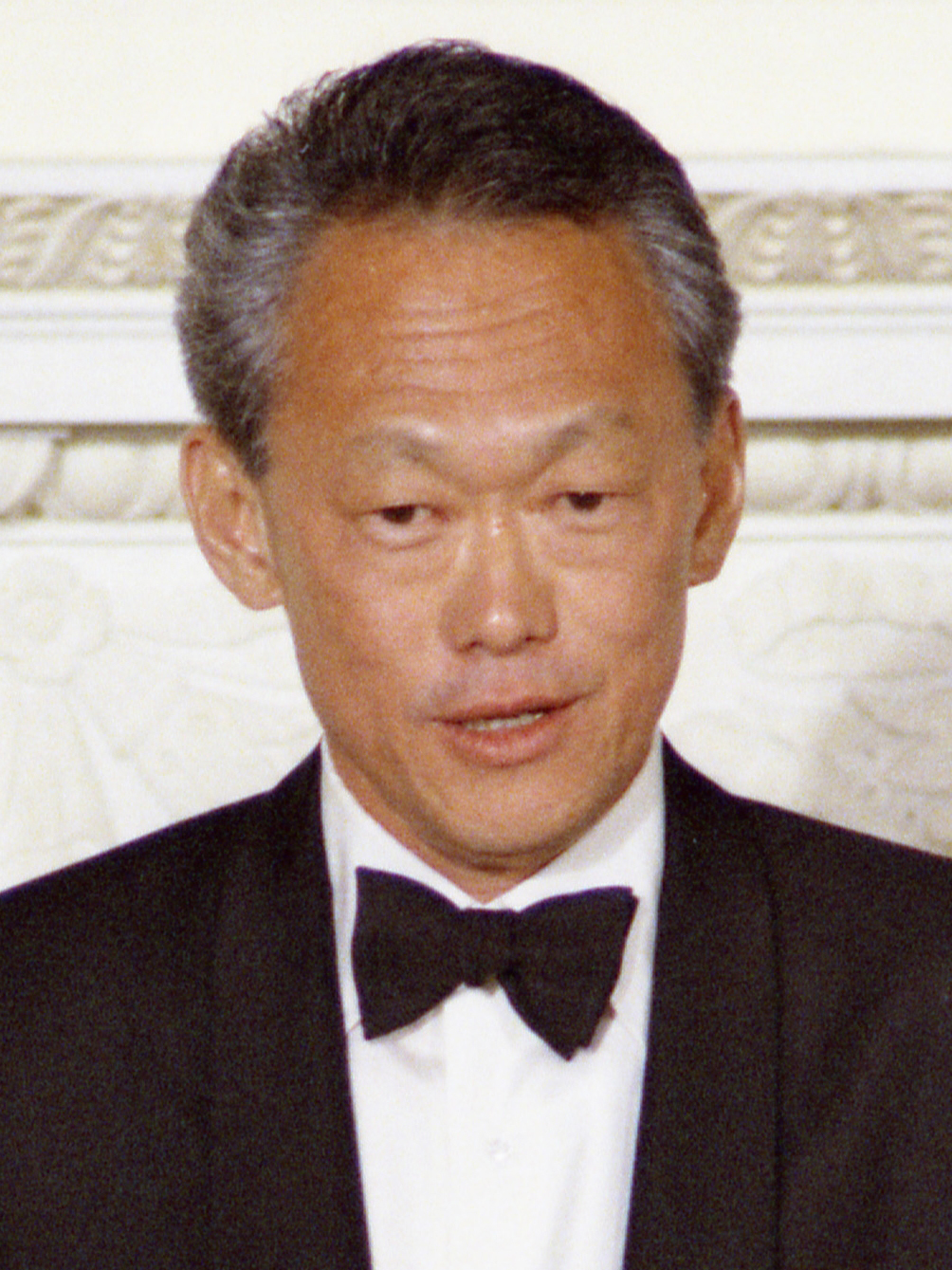
Lee Kuan Yew, 1st Prime Minister of Singapore

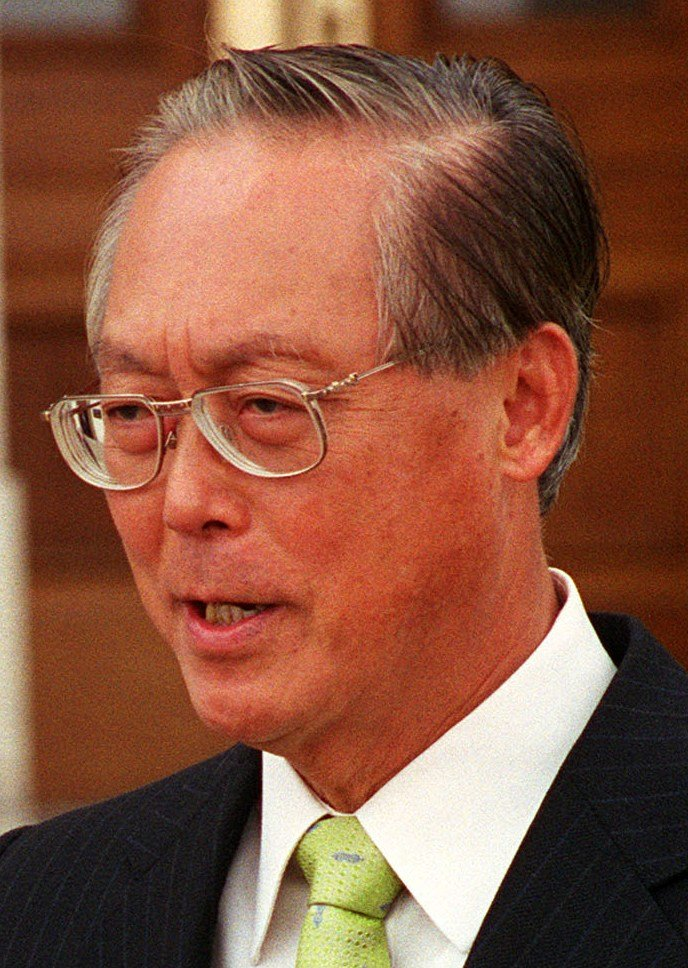
Goh Chok Tong, 2nd Prime Minister of Singapore

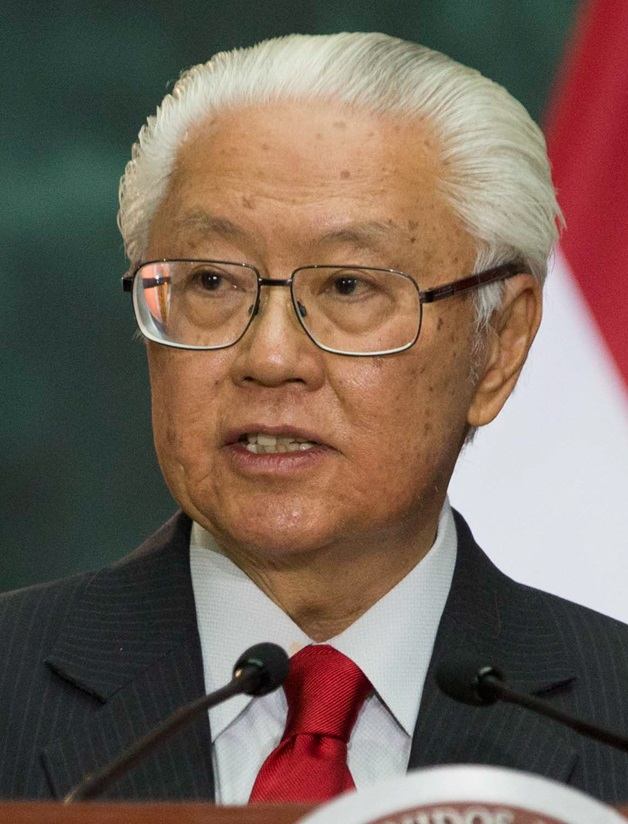
Tony Tan, 7th President of Singapore

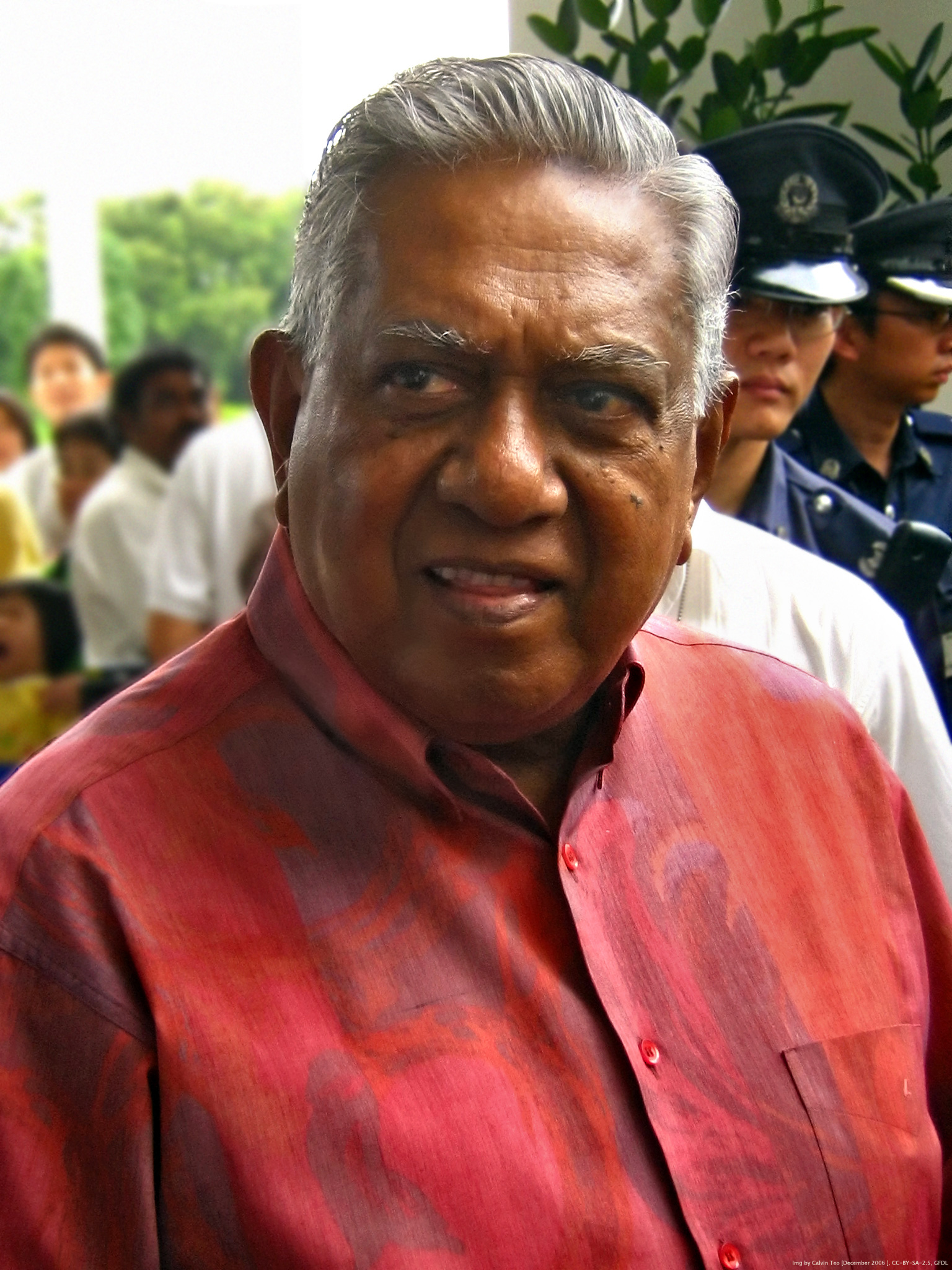
S. R. Nathan, 6th President of Singapore

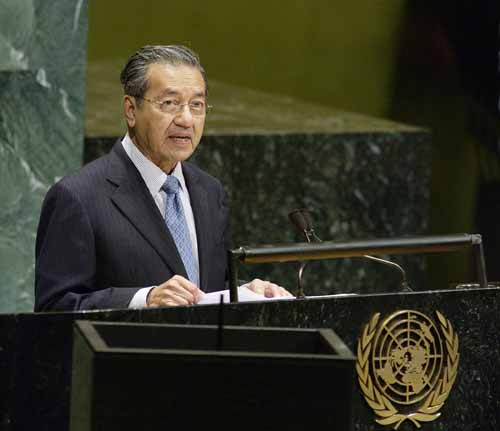
Mahathir Mohamad, 4th and 7th Prime Minister of Malaysia

Siti Hasmah, former Spouse of the Prime Minister of Malaysia Mahathir Mohamad

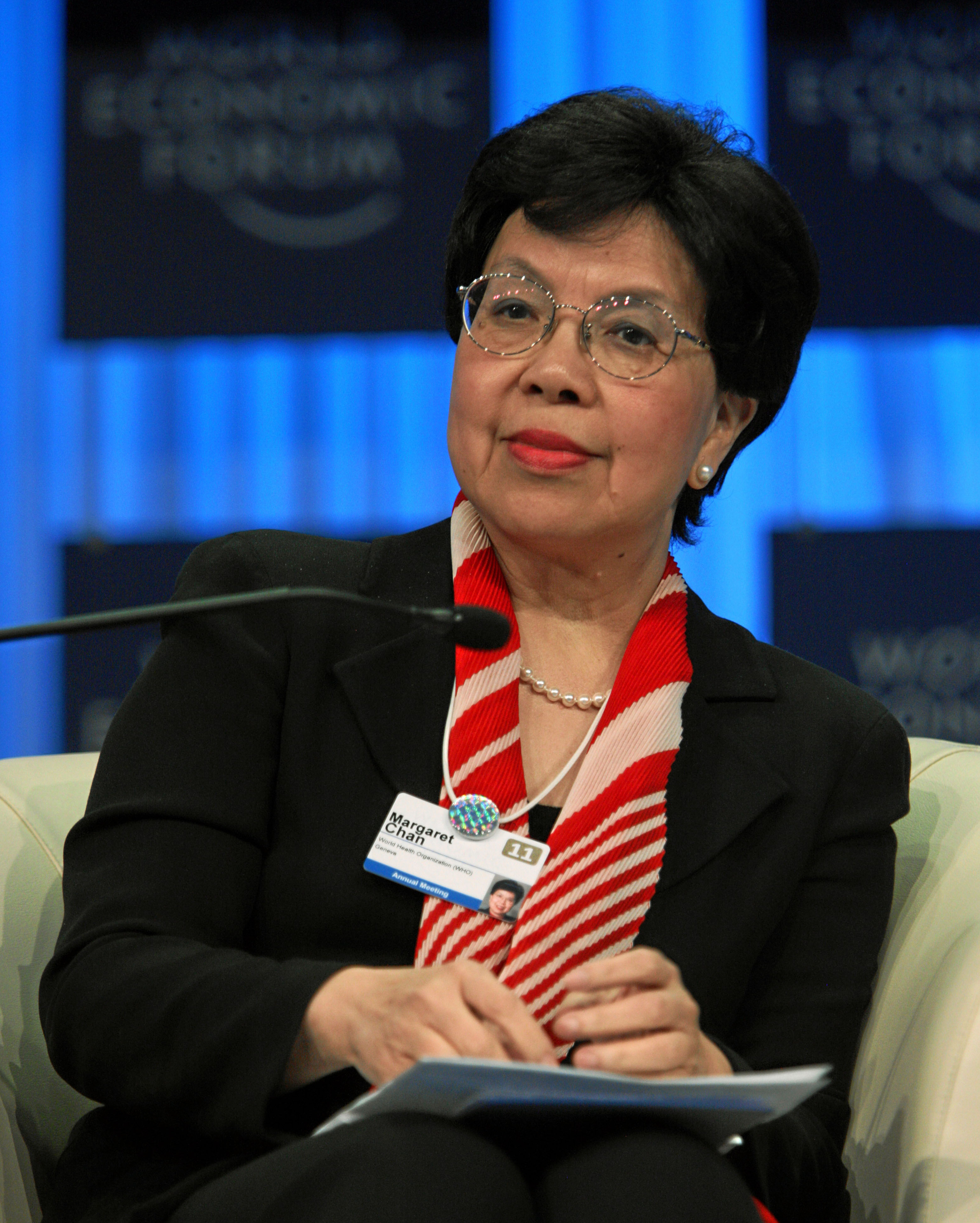
Margaret Chan, 7th Director-General of the World Health Organization

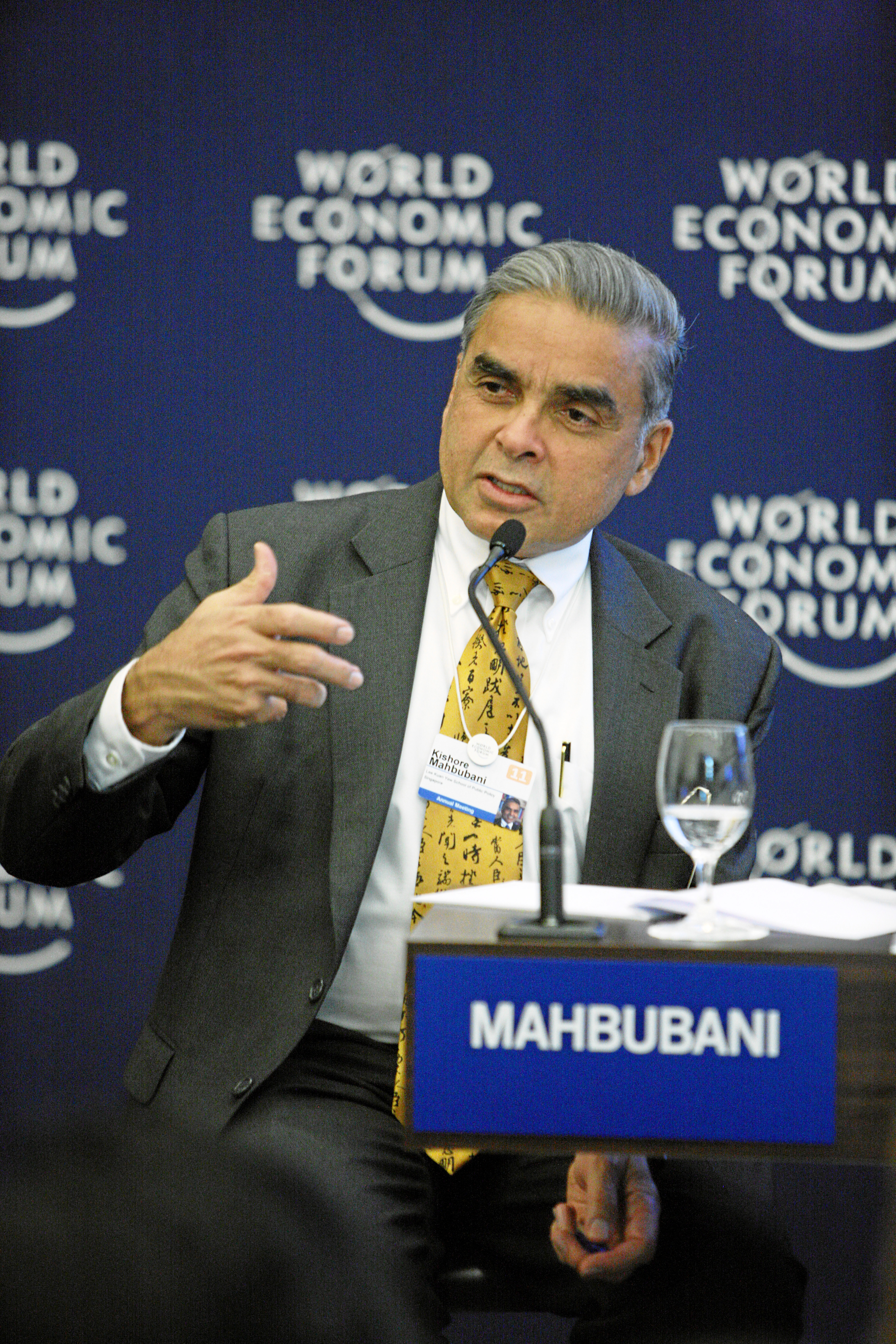
Kishore Mahbubani, President of the United Nations Security Council (2001–2002)

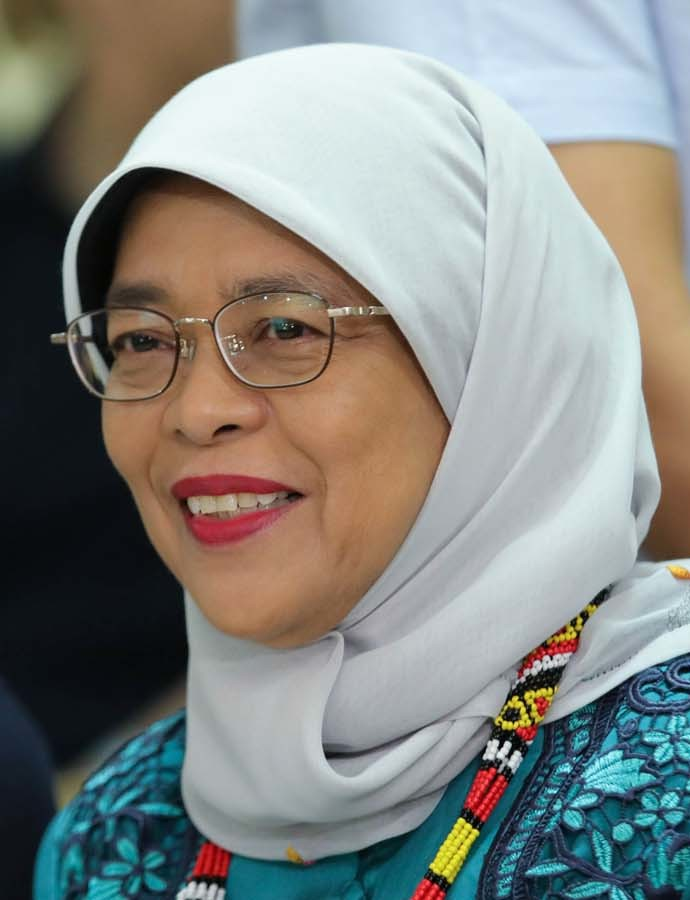
Halimah Yacob, 8th President of Singapore

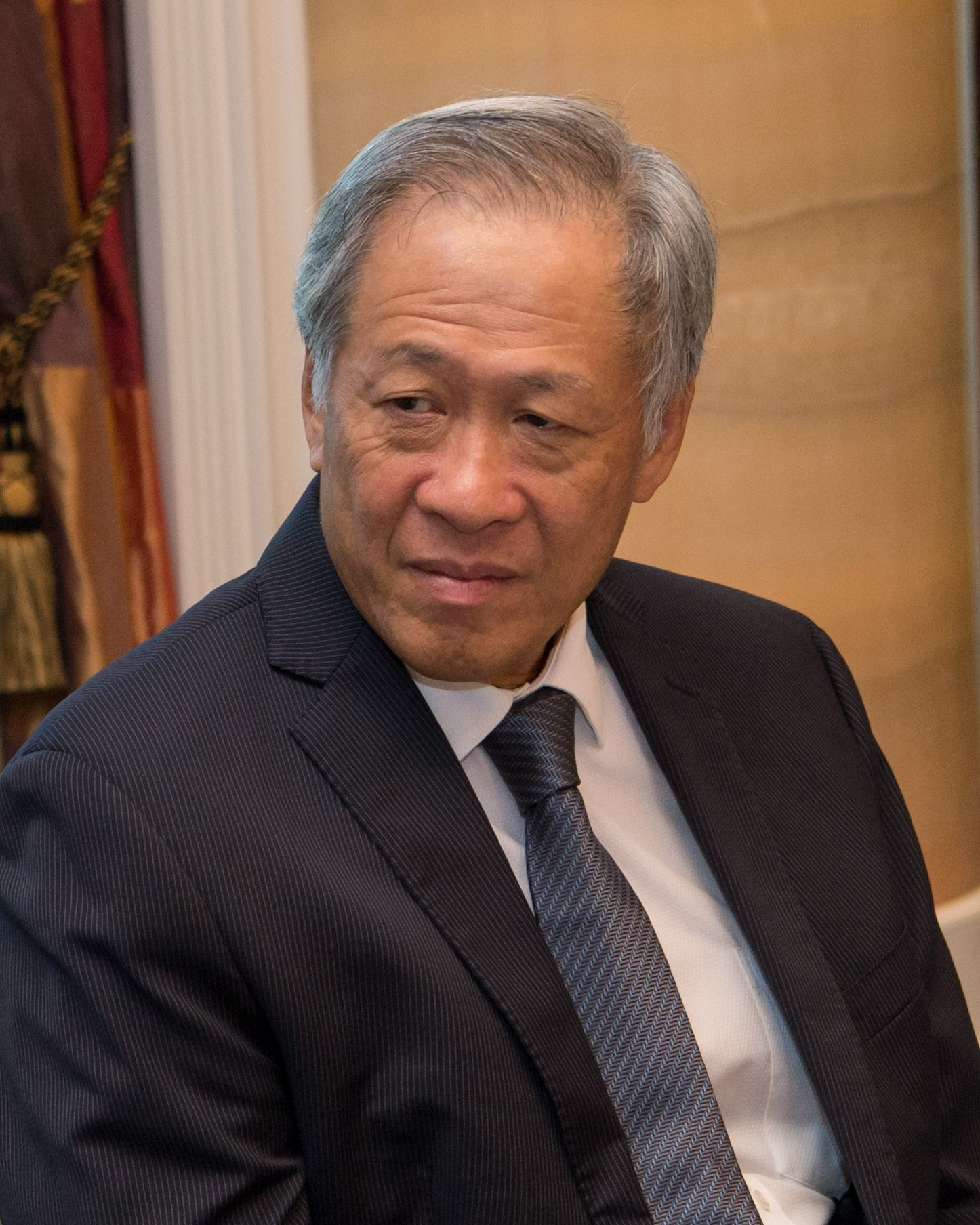
Ng Eng Hen, Singapore former Minister for Defence

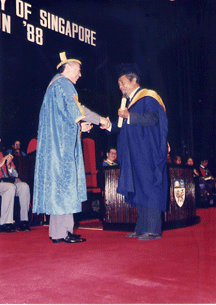
Sha'ari Tadin, Member of Parliament and founder of Singapore Central Council (Majlis Pusat Singapura)

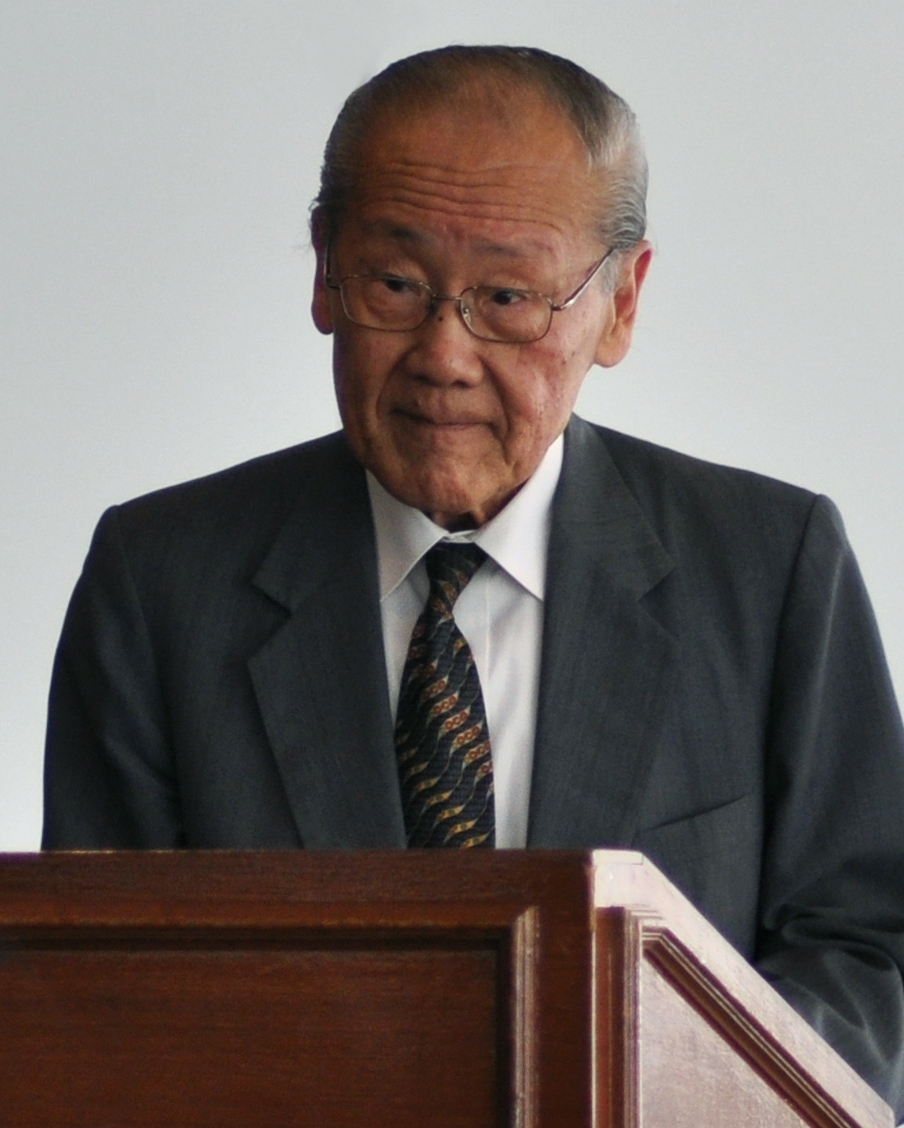
Wang Gungwu, Historian and Tang Prize Laureate

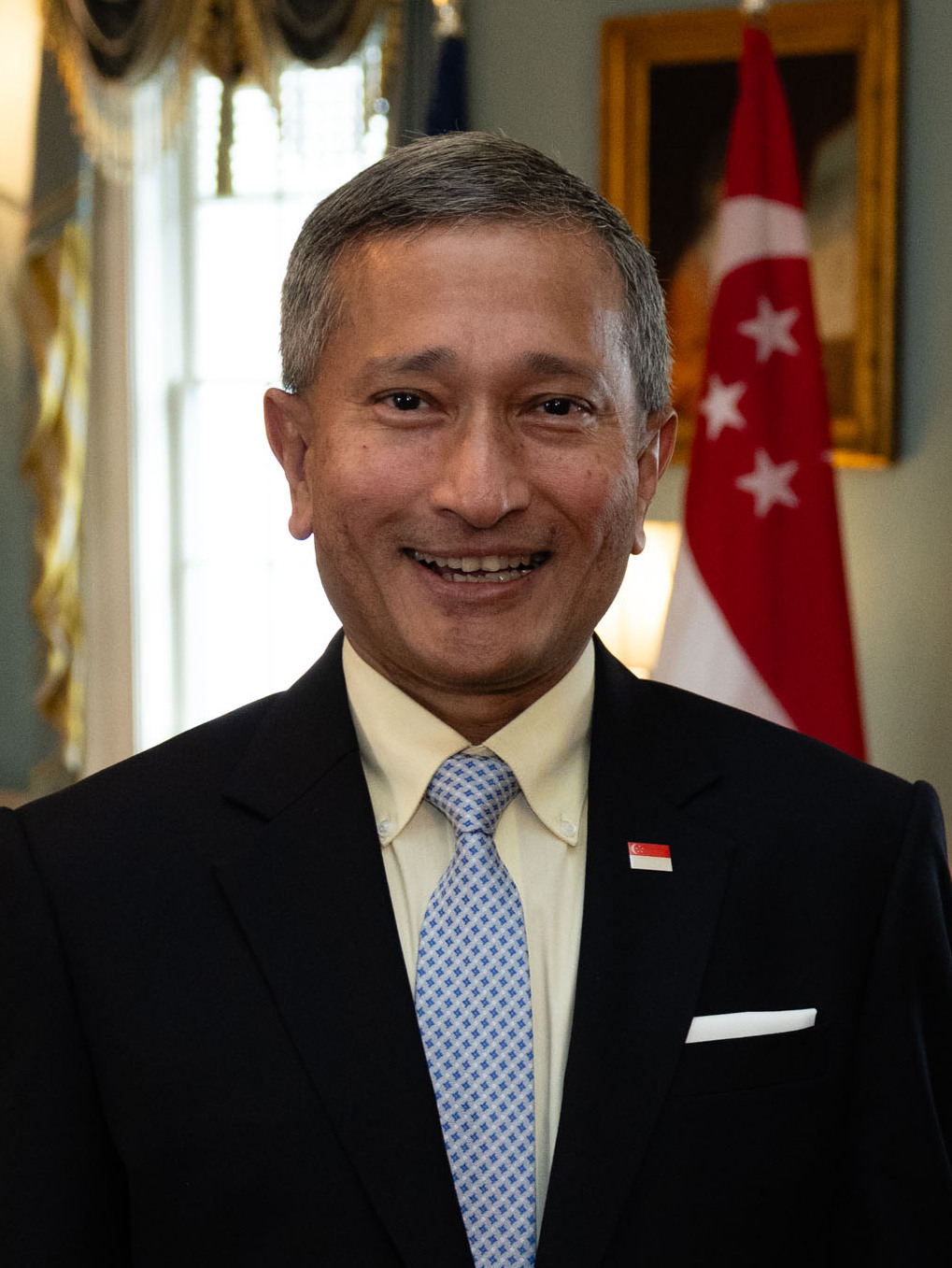
Vivian Balakrishnan, Minister for Foreign Affairs Singapore

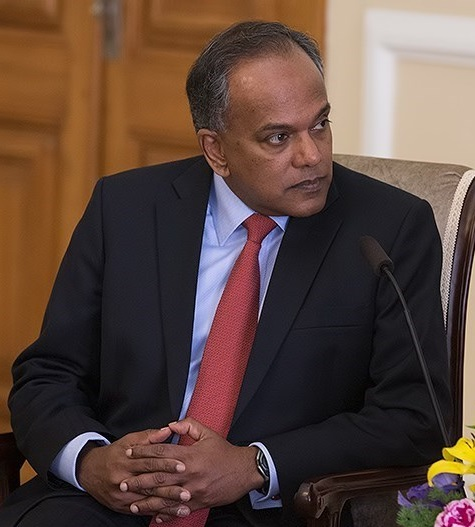
K Shanmugam, Minister for Home Affairs, Singapore

== See also ==
- Education in Singapore
- National University Hospital
- Nanyang University
- Universiti Malaya
- S*, a collaboration between seven universities and the Karolinska Institutet for training in bioinformatics and genomics
