= Pericles Lewis =

American professor (born 1968)

Dean of Yale College
- Incumbent
- Assumed office July 1, 2022
- Preceded by: Marvin Chun

1st President of Yale-NUS College
- In office July 1, 2012 – July 1, 2017
- Preceded by: Position established
- Succeeded by: Tan Tai Yong

Personal details
- Born: September 13, 1968 (age 58) Canada
- Education: McGill University (BA); Stanford University (MA, PhD)

Pericles Lewis (born September 13, 1968) is the Douglas Tracy Smith Professor of comparative literature at Yale University and the Dean of Yale College.

Previously at Yale, he was the founding president of Yale-NUS College, a liberal arts college in Singapore that was jointly governed by Yale and the National University of Singapore, as well as vice president for global strategy and vice provost for academic initiatives.

== Biography ==
Lewis was born in Canada on September 13, 1968. He is the grandson of Canadian Member of Parliament Andrew Brewin. He attended high school at the University of Toronto Schools and received his bachelor's degree in English literature from McGill University in 1990. He received the degree of A.M. in comparative literature in 1991 and his Ph.D., also in comparative literature, in 1997 from Stanford University, where his dissertation supervisor was Hans Ulrich Gumbrecht. He travelled extensively in Asia as a young man.

He is married to Sheila N. Hayre, clinical professor of law at Quinnipiac University.

== Career ==
=== Academic research ===
Lewis was appointed assistant professor at Yale in the departments of English and comparative literature in 1998, promoted to associate professor there in 2002, and full professor in 2007. He was director of undergraduate studies for the Yale literature major from 2000 to 2006, and director of graduate studies of Yale's Comparative Literature Department from 2006 to 2010. He was the recipient of the McGill Graduates' Society Award for Student Service (1990), a Whiting Fellowship (1997), the Heyman Prize (2000), a Morse Fellowship (2001), and the Yale Graduate Mentor Award (2004). As a scholar, he is best known for his books Modernism, Nationalism, and the Novel, The Cambridge Introduction to Modernism and Religious Experience and the Modernist Novel. He is also an editor of the third, fourth, and fifth editions of the widely used Norton Anthology of World Literature (2012; 2018; 2024) He was named Douglas Tracy Smith Professor of Comparative Literature in 2019.

He was the project director of the Yale Modernism Lab, a website for "collaborative research into the roots of literary modernism". He also serves on the editorial board of Modernism/Modernity.

=== Yale-NUS ===
He was appointed President of Yale-NUS, a liberal arts college affiliated with both Yale and the National University of Singapore, by a joint search committee; the appointment was announced on May 30, 2012, effective July 1, 2012. Before appointment, Lewis was a key planner of the new college's curriculum, and supervised the hiring of core faculty. The College's first students matriculated on July 2, 2013, and graduated on May 29, 2017. As President, Lewis advocated the concept of residential liberal arts education as "building a community of learning." In August 2021, NUS announced that it intended to dissolve its relationship with Yale University by 2025, combining Yale-NUS with another program to become NUS College.

Then as Yale's vice president for global strategy from 2017 to 2022, he was involved in planning the launches of the Yale Jackson School for Global Affairs, the Yale Institute for Global Health and the Yale Schwarzman Center.

=== Dean of Yale College ===
He became the dean of Yale College on July 1, 2022. As Dean, he revised Yale's policies on student leaves of absence for mental health at the time of the Elis for Rachael settlement, recruited a number of heads and deans for Yale's residential colleges, and opened an Office of Educational Opportunity. In his first-year address in 2022, he spoke about Conversation. His second first-year address, in 2023, focused on Community. He launched the dean’s dialogue series to encourage civil discourse on difficult topics, including national politics and the conflict in the Middle East. Following the report of the Committee on Trust in Higher Education, he chaired the President's Council on Yale College Admissions and announced a return to Yale's pre-pandemic standardized testing policy. Under Lewis's leadership, Yale announced a policy making tuition at Yale College free for students from families earning less than $200,000 a year.

In the fall term of the 2026-2027 academic year, Lewis will teach a class titled: “Purposes of College Education.” The class will serve as a DeVane Lectures course, meaning it will be open to the public. This is the first time he has taught a class in four years.

== Honors and awards ==
- Graduate Mentor Award (2004), Yale University.
- Samuel and Ronnie Heyman Prize for Outstanding Scholarly Work by a Junior Faculty Member (2000), Yale University.
- Morse Fellowship for Junior Faculty in the Humanities (2001-2002), Yale University.
- Whiting Fellowship in the Humanities (1994–1995).
- Pre-doctoral Fellow (1993-1994), Stanford Humanities Center.

== Criticism ==
In 2019, Lewis faced criticism for leading Yale's investigation into the cancellation of a course on dissent at Yale-NUS, despite having served as its first president. Lewis concluded the cancellation resulted from administrative error rather than government interference. Some Yale faculty senators questioned the impartiality of the report, with professor Mimi Yiengpruksawan notably arguing that Lewis' prior role made an independent review impossible, while other senators supported Lewis’s findings. The canceled course's instructor publicly disputed Lewis' findings, accusing Yale of scapegoating him in order to demonstrated that academic freedom did exist at Yale-NUS.

During the 2024 pro-Palestinian protests on university campuses, Lewis briefly received backlash for alleging that protestors at Yale included "non-Yale [individuals] with a known history of violent confrontation with police" which protest organizers called "racist and classist against New Haveners." Lewis later recanted his statement.

During the 2025-2026 academic year, Lewis received repeated student criticism for his budgetary decisions in the wake of the endowment tax passed under the Trump administration. In November 2025, Lewis made cuts summer financial aid for study abroad and summer experience funding, which he defended as necessary to preserve financial aid during the academic year. A quarter of the undergraduate student body signed a petition seeking the reversal of this decision. Lewis later authorized cuts to the staff of the Yale Sustainable Food Program from four staff members to three. In response, 'Yale Farm' student leaders circulated a petition with 1,400 signatures calling for transparency and the restoration of the program's funding. In March 2026, Lewis announced Yale would finish phasing out summer storage stipend support for Yale students on financial aid, advising all students "not to buy too much stuff." His response sparked widespread backlash from students. Yale Professor Emeritus of History Glenda Gilmore published a response stating that this remark from Lewis "seemed arrogant," criticizing Yale's placement of the budgetary burden on those "least equipped to bear [it]." Lewis later apologized for his comment. The following year, he restored summer storage support for low-income students after concerted student advocacy.

In one poll conducted by the student newspaper, the Yale Daily News, Lewis received a 16% favorability rating from the class of 2026, the first graduating cohort to have spent all four years under his deanship.

== Publications ==
=== Books ===
- The Cambridge Companion to European Modernism. Cambridge: Cambridge University Press, 2011. ISBN 9780521199414
- Religious Experience and the Modernist Novel. New York: Cambridge University Press, 2010. ISBN 9780521856508
- The Cambridge Introduction to Modernism. Cambridge: Cambridge University Press, 2007. ISBN 9780521828093.
- Modernism, Nationalism, and the Novel. Cambridge, U.K.: Cambridge University Press, 2000. ISBN 9780521661119
  - Review by Alan Munton, The Modern Language Review, April 2003, vol. 98, no. 2, pp. 443-444

=== Articles ===
- "The Rise and Restructuring of Yale-NUS College: An International Liberal Arts Partnership in Singapore." Daedalus (2024).
- “Proust, Woolf, and modern fiction.” Romanic Review 99 (2008): 77–86.
- “The Reality of the unseen: Shared fictions and religious experience in the ghost stories of Henry James.” Arizona Quarterly 61.2 (Summer 2005): 33–66.
- “Christopher Newman’s haircloth shirt: worldly asceticism, conversion, and auto-machia in The American.” Studies in the Novel 37 (2005): 308–28.
- “Churchgoing in the Modern Novel.” Modernism/Modernity 11 (2004): 667–94.
- “James’s Sick Souls.” Henry James Review 22 (2001): 248–58.
- “‘His Sympathies were in the Right Place’: Heart of Darkness and the discourse of national character.” Nineteenth-Century Literature 53 (1998): 211-44. (Reprinted in Joseph Conrad’s Heart of Darkness: Modern Critical Interpretations, 2008).
- “The ‘True’ Homer: myth and enlightenment in Vico, Horkheimer, and Adorno." New Vico Studies 10 (1992): 24–35.

=== Books edited ===
Norton Anthology of World Literature New York: Norton, 2012. Ed. Martin Puchner et al.
