= Centre for Quantum Technologies =

Research institute in Singapore

Centre for Quantum Technologies (CQT)
- CQT Logo
- Type: Research institute
- Established: 2007
- Founder: Artur Ekert (2007 - Jul 2020)
- Affiliations: National University of Singapore
- Director: José Ignacio Latorre (Jul 2020 – present)
- Location: Singapore, Singapore; 1.2971°N 103.7781°E
- People: 150+ scientific researchers and support staff
- Website: www.quantumlah.org

The Centre for Quantum Technologies (CQT) in Singapore is a Research Centre of Excellence hosted by the National University of Singapore. The Centre brings together physicists, computer scientists and engineers to do basic research on quantum physics and to build devices based on quantum phenomena. Experts in quantum technologies are applying their discoveries in computing, communications and sensing.

== Mission statement ==
The mission of CQT is to conduct interdisciplinary theoretical and experimental research in quantum theory and its application to information processing. The discovery that quantum physics allows fundamentally new modes of information processing has required that classical theories of computation, information and cryptography be superseded by their quantum generalizations. These hold out the promise of faster computation and more secure communication than is possible classically. A key focus of CQT is the development of quantum technologies for the coherent control of individual photons and atoms, exploring both the theory and the practical possibilities of constructing quantum-mechanical devices for cryptography and computation.

== History ==
Research in quantum information science in Singapore began in 1998. It was initiated by Kwek Leong Chuan, Lai Choy Heng, Oh Choo Hiap and Kuldip Singh as a series of informal seminars at the National University of Singapore. The seminars attracted local researchers and as a result, the Quantum Information Technology Group (informally referred to in Singlish as "quantum lah") was formed.

In February 2002, with support from Singapore's Agency for Science, Technology and Research (A*STAR), research efforts in the field were consolidated. This led to a number of faculty appointments.

In 2007 the Quantum Information Technology Group was selected as the core of Singapore's first Research Centre of Excellence. The Centre for Quantum Technologies was founded in December 2007 with $158 million to spend over ten years.

The Centre for Quantum Technologies is funded by the Singapore National Research Foundation and the Ministry of Education. It is hosted by the National University of Singapore, but has significant autonomy both in pursuing its research goals and in governance. The centre has its own Governing Board, a Scientific Advisory Board and is headed by the centre director.

== Research ==
The Centre for Quantum Technologies conducts research across a wide range of areas in quantum information science, from theoretical to applied. Research results from CQT are published in major journals, including Nature, Science and Physical Review Letters. The centre has more than 20 research groups active across a range of topics:

=== Computer Science ===
Research areas include:

- Quantum algorithm, Quantum network
- Communication complexity, Query complexity
- Interactive proofs, Zero-knowledge proofs, and Quantum games

=== Interdisciplinary Theory ===
Research areas include:

- Entanglement
- Quantum computation and cryptography
- Quantum information
- Cold fermions

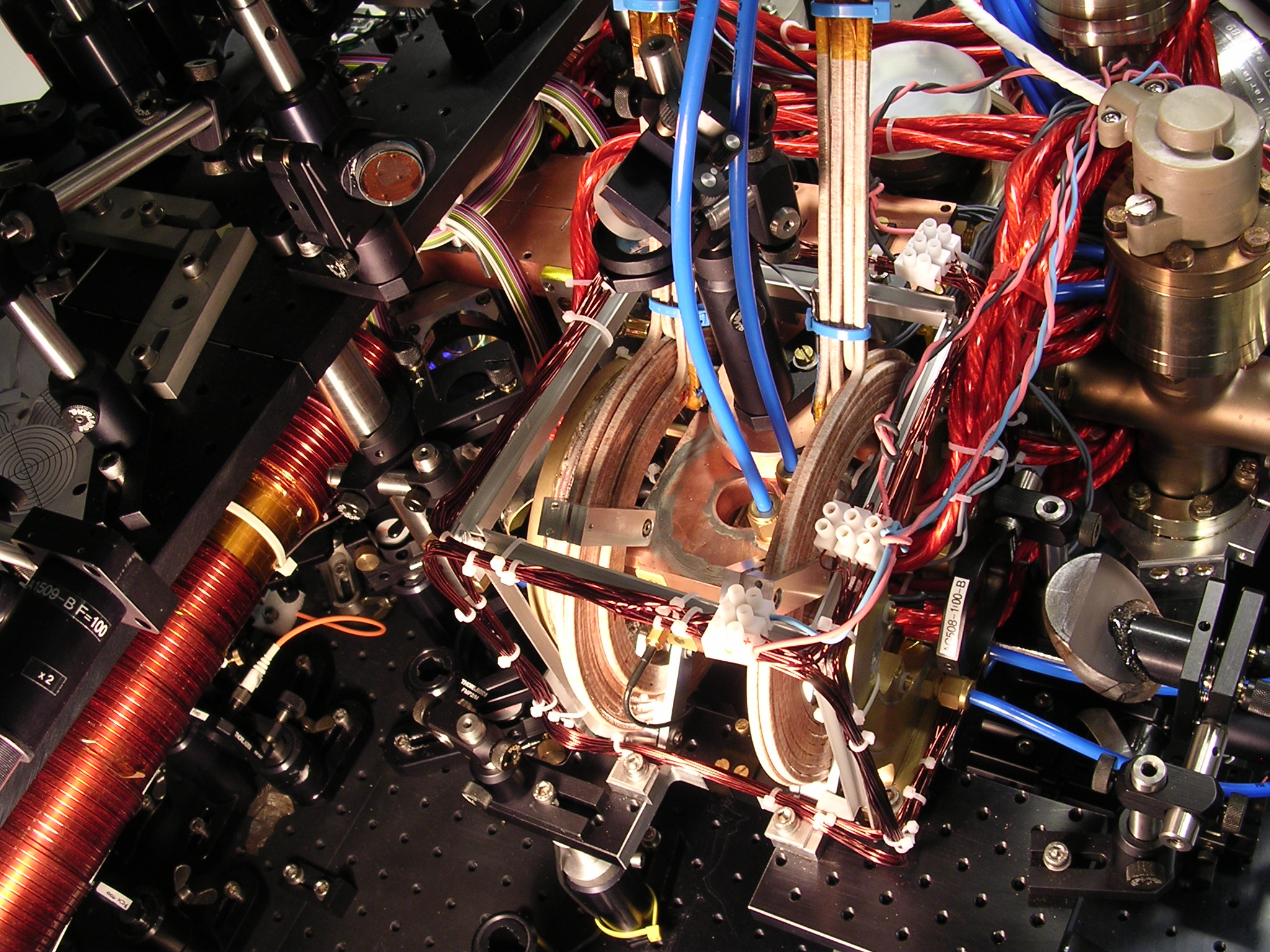
Quantum Matter Setup at The Centre for Quantum Technologies

=== Experimental Labs ===
Research areas include:

- Quantum optics
  - Sources of entangled photon pairs
  - Single atom quantum interfaces
  - Quantum cryptography and Quantum hacking
- Cold atoms and ions
  - Atom Chips
  - Ion traps
  - Optical cavities
  - Optical traps
  - Optical lattices
  - Fermionic condensates

== Graduate Program ==
The Centre for Quantum Technologies provides a joint graduate studies program with the National University of Singapore.

== Visiting Fellows ==
The Centre attracts outstanding early- and mid-career researchers from leading institutions to work collaboratively with NUS host faculty engaged in quantum information science research. Notable visitors in the past include Mary Beth Ruskai and Reinhard F. Werner. Of late, researchers from technology spin-offs have also been invited.

== Outreach and Events ==
CQT organises events including colloquia, talks, workshops, and conferences. The centre has a page on Facebook, a YouTube channel and tweets on Twitter as @quantumlah.

== Facilities ==
CQT is the principal occupant of the building at 3 Science Drive 2 (off Lower Kent Ridge Road), Block S15 on the campus of the National University of Singapore. The building is readily accessible by the NUS Internal Bus Service 'A1', 'A2', 'C' or 'D' to CQT.

CQT's Quantum Cafe is well known to its visitors, staff and students, as is the large food court located behind the main building.

Visitors travelling to CQT by taxi from the airport should expect a journey of 30–45 minutes and a fare of S$25–30. A cab ride from the city-centre to CQT takes about 15–25 minutes with a fare of S$15–20.

== See also ==
- Quantum information science
- National University of Singapore
- John Baez
- Artur Ekert
- Lai Choy Heng
- Vlatko Vedral
