= Holly Jones =

Holly Jones may refer to:

- Holly Jones (murder victim) (died 2003), child murdered in Toronto
- Holly Jones (ecologist), American restoration ecologist and conservation biologist
- Holly Jones (politician), American legislator in the state of Missouri
