= Joanne Roberts =

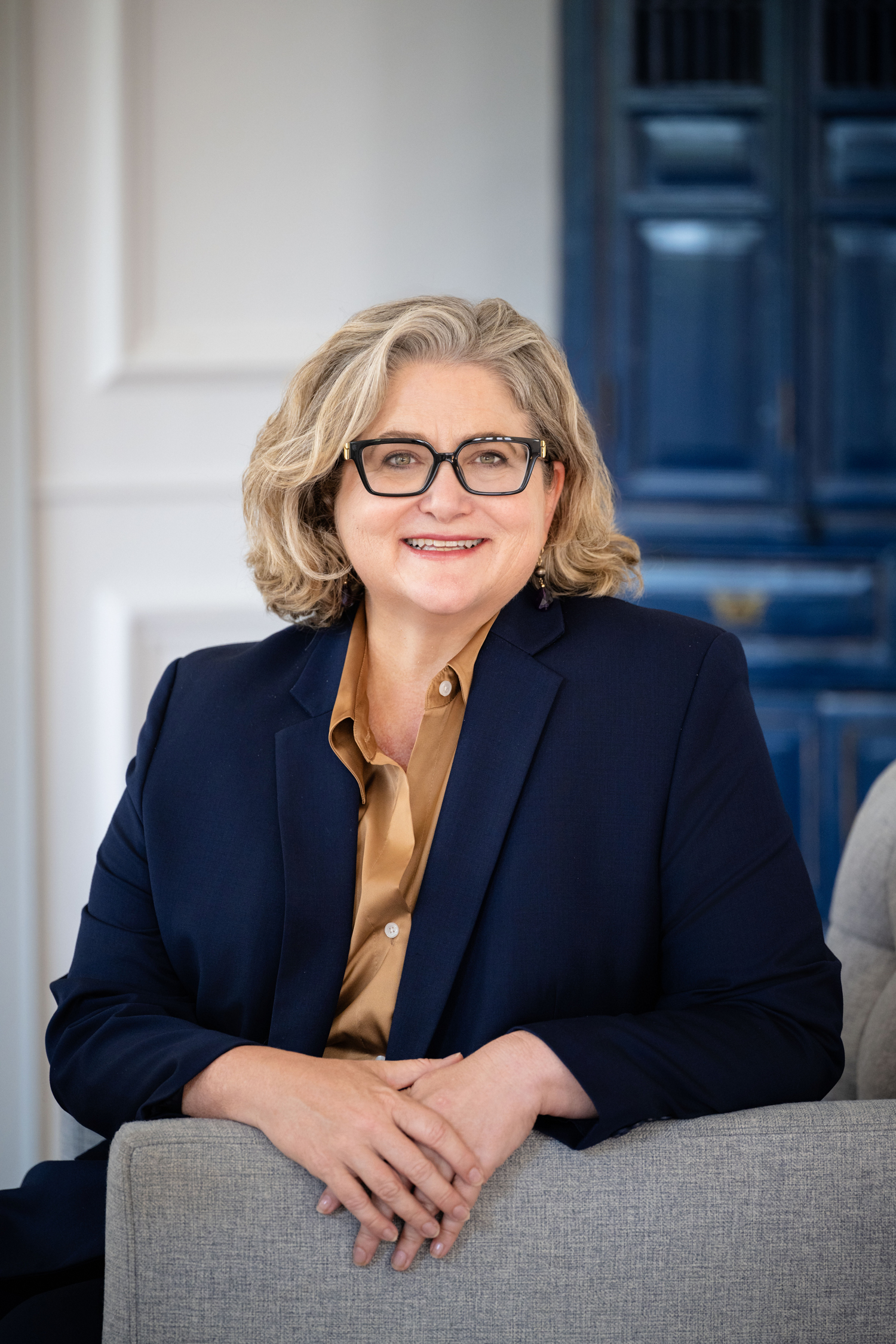

3rd President of Yale-NUS College
- Outgoing
- Assumed office 1 July 2022 – present
- Preceded by: Tan Tai Yong
- Succeeded by: Office abolished

Vice President (Humanities and Social Sciences Research) of the National University of Singapore
- Designate
- Assumed office 1 July 2025
- Preceding: Office established

Personal details
- Spouse: Eugene Choo
- Education: University of Waterloo (B.A. (Honours) Economics); Queen’s University (M.A. Economics); Queen’s University (Ph.D. Economics)
- Profession: Economist

Joanne Roberts is a senior academic administrator. She was the third President and Professor of Social Sciences (Economics) at Yale-NUS College, the first liberal arts college in Singapore. She was also a professor at the National University of Singapore, Department of Economics. She also served as Vice President (Humanities and Social Sciences Research)-Designate at National University of Singapore from 1 January to 30 June 2025, during which time she continued to serve as President of Yale-NUS College. On July 1, 2025, she joined Bates College as its Vice President for Academic Affairs and Dean of the Faculty.

Roberts obtained her bachelor's degree in economics from the University of Waterloo in 1993. She earned both her Master's and PhD degrees in economics from Queen's University in 1995 and 1998, respectively.

She is a Canadian citizen and held multiple leadership positions in the Economics profession in Canada prior to her move to Singapore.

== Academic career ==
Roberts started her academic career as an assistant professor at University of Toronto, Department of Economics in 1998 and was promoted to associate professor in 2004. She then joined University of Calgary as an associate professor in 2008, Canada Research Chair in the Economics of Organizations from 2009 to 2014, and became a full Professor in 2012. She was a Senior Visiting Fellow at the National University of Singapore in 2011 and 2015 where she taught modules such as Law and Economics and Intermediate Microeconomics. She also served as the Chair of the management board of the Asia Research Institute until 30 June 2025.

Her career at Yale-NUS College, a joint venture between Yale University and the National University of Singapore, began in 2015 where she joined as a visiting professor. Roberts served as the Associate Dean of Faculty in 2017 and Executive Vice President (Academic Affairs) in 2018. She was responsible for faculty hiring, retention, and development; all aspects of the curriculum and student life, among others. Some of her notable contributions include extensive faculty recruitment with a focus on diversity, the implementation of a robust faculty mentoring and development framework, the revamp of research grant processes and support, a holistic review of the signature Common Curriculum and a review and reshaping of residential life structure and programming.

Upon Tan Tai Yong's completion of his full-five year presidential term at Yale-NUS in 2022, Roberts was appointed as the college's third President and started her presidential term at Yale-NUS on 1 July 2022. As the President of Yale-NUS College, she oversees all dimensions of the academic programmes, administration and external relations of the autonomous liberal arts college, ensuring the continuity of student experience. With the community, she has also developed a suite of initiatives to ensure the College's legacy, including spearheading the formation of its Alumni Association the Yale-NUS Club. She was also involved in coordinating the transition of Yale-NUS College into its successor institution, NUS College, and chaired its curriculum committee. She has also served on NUS' dean search committee, discipline advisory and sexual misconduct committees amongst others.

== Research ==
Roberts is a public economist who has a keen interest in how incentives affect behaviour in a broad number of situations. Her recent work has focused on legal institutions, tax evasion and charitable giving.

She was affiliated with the Centre interuniversitaire sur le risque, les politiques economiques et l’emploi (CIRPEE) from 2002 to 2011, and the Canadian Institute for Advanced Research (CIFAR) from 2001 to 2009.

Roberts was the co-editor of the Canadian Journal of Economics from 2010 to 2014, and the Associate Editor of the Australian Economic Review in 2017.

== Professional activities ==
Roberts was an Executive Member of the Canadian Economic Association from 2006 to 2009.

Subsequently, she was the President of the Canadian Women’s Economic Network from 2009 to 2011.

She was also an Academic Advisor and External Reviewer for Fulbright University, Vietnam from 2019 to 2020, and an External Reviewer for University of Toronto Mississauga – Institute for Management and Innovation, Masters in Management and Innovation in 2022.

From 2022 through 2025, Roberts served as a jury member for Steward Leadership 25, an initiative by INSEAD-Hoffman Global Institute for Business and Society and Singapore Press Holdings that showcases projects from for-profit organisations that have demonstrated resolute actions to drive profitable growth.

== Conferences and speaking engagements ==
Roberts has organised multiple local and international academic conferences. In 2010 and 2015, she organised the Canadian Public Economics Meeting at Queen’s University and the University of British Columbia. She was a Scientific Committee Member for the International Institute for Public Finance Congress in 2017. In 2024, she organised and delivered the opening remarks for the Learning from Global Liberal Education: Innovation and Resilience conference at Yale-NUS College in Singapore.

Roberts has been invited to speak around the region including in India, Malaysia and Singapore. She has spoken at various events such as the Nobel Prize Dialogue Singapore 2022, 2023 AmCham Singapore Regional Economic Conference: Multilateral Collaboration for Financial Growth, the National University of Singapore Leadership Development Course, Liberal Arts Education: Open and Critical Conversations at Krea University in India, and the Times Higher Education Asia Universities Summit 2024, Bridging frontiers: Changing the Landscape of Education in Asia, in Kuala Lumpur, Malaysia.

== Community service ==
Roberts was a board member of the Calgary Immigrant Women's Association (CIWA) from 2010 to 2011. CIWA is an organisation that is dedicated to engage and integrate immigrant and their families in the community.

She is currently an Advisory Council member of NINEby9, an initiative launched in Singapore with the focus on driving gender equality within organisations.

Since 2022, Roberts has been a volunteer at Willing Hearts, a charity that operates a soup kitchen that prepares, cooks and distributes daily meals in Singapore.

Since 2023, Roberts has been an Executive Forum Member at Dulwich College Singapore.

== Awards and honours ==
In 2001, Roberts was named as one of the Polanyi Prize Winners by the Council of Ontario Universities. The prizes are awarded annually to early-career researchers who are either continuing postdoctoral work or have recently gained a faculty appointment and in honour of Ontario's Nobel Prize winner, John C. Polanyi.

Her article on the Journal of Law, Economics, and Organisation (JLEO) titled "Rehabilitated or Not: An Informational Theory of Parole Decisions" was the runner-up for the Oliver E. Williamson Prize for Best Article in 2011.

== Notable publications ==
- “The Effect of Tax Price on Donations: Evidence from Canada” with Ross Hickey, Bradley Minaker, Abigail Payne and Justin Smith, National Tax Journal, in press.
- “Private Protection and Public Policing” with Ross Hickey, Steeve Mongrain and Tanguy van Ypersele, (2021) Journal of Public Economic Theory, 23:5–28.
- “Evasion of Fiscal and Labour Regulations: Firm Behaviour and Optimal Tax Policy” with Kate Cuff and Steeve Mongrain, (2020) Journal of Public Economic Theory, 22: 69–97.
- “Rehabilitated or Not: an Informational Theory of Parole Decisions” with Dan Bernhardt and Steeve Mongrain, (2012) Journal of Law, Economics, and Organisation, 28:186-210. Runner-up for the Oliver E. Williamson prize for best article
- “Optimal Policies and the Informal Sector” with Katherine Cuff, Nicolas Marceau and Steeve Mongrain, (2011) Journal of Public Economics, 95 (11–12): 1280–1291
- “Government Oversight of Public Universities: Are Centralized Performance Schemes Related to Increased Quantity or Quality?” with A. Abigail Payne, (2010) Review of Economics and Statistics, 92(1): 207–212.
- “Plea Bargaining with Budgetary Constraints” with Steeve Mongrain, (2009) International Review of Law and Economics, (29): 8-12
- “Unemployment Insurance and Experience Rating: Insurance versus Efficiency” with Steeve Mongrain, (2005) International Economic Review 46(4): 1303–1319.
- “Banks and Enterprise Privatization in China” with Loren Brandt and Hongbin Li, (2005) Journal of Law, Economics, and Organization 21(2): 524–546.
- “Contracting Productivity Growth” with Patrick Francois, (2003) Review of Economic Studies, 70: 59–85.
- “Relationships, Commitment, and Labour Productivity Growth” with Patrick Francois, (2003) Journal of the European Economic Association, 1: 612–20.
- “Implementing the Efficient Allocation of Pollution” with John Duggan, (2002) American Economic Review, 92(4): 1070–1078. Reprinted in Public Sector Economics: Critical Perspectives, edited by Richard Tresch, Routledge, 2009.
- “Twin Engines of Growth: Skills and Technology as Equal Partners in Balanced Growth” with Huw Lloyd Ellis, (2002) The Journal of Economic Growth, 7(2): 87–115.
- “Needs-Based Health Care Funding: Implications for Resource Distribution in Ontario” with Kelly Bedard, John Dorland, and Allan Gregory, (2000) Canadian Journal of Economics, 33(4): 981–1008.
- “Riding Free on the Signals of Others” with Kim Alexander-Cook and Dan Bernhardt, (1998) Journal of Public Economics, 67(1): 25–43.

=== Book chapters ===
- “Banks and Enterprise Privatization in China” with Loren Brandt and Hongbin Li, in China's Macroeconomic Policy, edited by Linda Yueh, Routledge, 2015
- “Implementing the Efficient Allocation of Pollution” with John Duggan, in Public Sector Economics: Critical Perspectives, edited by Richard Tresch, Routledge, 2009.
