= Holly Jones (ecologist) =

American restoration ecologist

- Education: University of California, Santa Cruz
- Scientific career
- Fields: Ecology
- Workplaces: Northern Illinois University

Holly P. Jones is an American restoration ecologist and conservation biologist. She is an associate professor at Northern Illinois University.

== Education ==
Jones completed a Bachelor of Science in ecology, evolutionary biology, and marine biology from University of California, Santa Cruz. She earned a master of philosophy in forestry and environmental studies from Yale University in 2007. She completed a doctor of philosophy in 2010. Oswald Schmitz was her doctoral advisor. David M. Post, Peter A. Raymond, and David Towns served on Jones' dissertation committee.

== Career ==
Jones worked as an ecosystem-based adaptation consultant from 2010 to 2012 at Conservation International and UC Santa Cruz under supervisor David Hole. In 2011, she was an ecosystem recovery and resilience consultant at The Nature Conservancy and UC Santa Cruz under supervisor Peter Kareiva. She was a visiting postdoctoral scholar at UC Santa Cruz from August 2010 to August 2012 in the department of environmental studies. Her advisor was Erika Zavaleta. She became an assistant professor in the department of biological sciences at Northern Illinois University and The Institute for the Study of Environment, Sustainability and Energy (ESE). In September 2015, she began as a research associate at the Auckland University of Technology, Institute for Applied Ecology. She is an associate editor of Ecological Restoration, Biological Invasions, and Conservation Science and Practice. She is an associate professor at Northern Illinois University.

=== Research ===
Jones' laboratory researches how to prioritize restoration, connections between ecosystem restoration and conservation, and global climate change. She works on islands quantifying ecosystem recovery following invasive mammal removal and she works on bison reintroduction impacts to restored tallgrass prairies. She's produced numerous reviews and meta analyses on ecosystem recovery and restoration following disturbances. She is a National Geographic Society grant awardee and National Geographic Explorer.

== Personal life ==
Jones is married and has two daughters.
