= Lai Choy Heng =

Lai Choy Heng (Chinese: 賴載興; pinyin: Lài Zàixìng) is Emeritus Professor of Physics, NUS Emeritus Executive Vice-President and President Advisor (Tianjin University-NUS Joint Institute, Fuzhou, China), and the former Executive Vice-president (Academic Affairs), Yale-NUS College (2012–2014) and Vice Provost (Academic Personnel) at the National University of Singapore (2003–2012). He received his undergraduate as well as graduate degrees from the University of Chicago. He took up a position as post-doctoral Research Fellow at the Niels Bohr Institute, University of Copenhagen from 1978 to 1980 after which he joined National University of Singapore’s (NUS) Department of Mathematics as a Lecturer. He then moved to the Department of Physics in 1981 which saw him rise through the ranks from senior lecturer to associate professor to professor.

== Academic career ==
To date, Lai has held several administrative appointments within the university. He was Head of the Departments of Computational Science (1996–97) and Physics (1998–2000) and was concurrently the Vice Dean of the Faculty of Science from 1996 to 2000. He became Dean from 2000 to 2003 and was appointed the university's Vice Provost (Academic Personnel) in June 2003. He was also the deputy director of the Centre for Quantum Technologies, a Research Centre of Excellence in quantum information science and technology at NUS 2007-2022. Lai was also involved in the NUS NanoScience and NanoTechnology Initiative as the chairman of its management board, and chaired the Management Board of the NUS Institute for Mathematical Sciences from 2015 to 2023.

As Vice Provost (Academic Personnel), Lai chaired the University Promotion and Tenure Committee and works with the Provost in academic personnel matters, performance evaluation, benchmarking, university resources and space allocation. He oversaw the functions of the university's Centre for Information Technology, University Scholars Programme, The Logistics Institute-Asia Pacific, NUS-Fudan Joint Graduate School and the NUS NanoScience and NanoTechnology Initiative.

== Research, honours and awards ==
Lai Choy Heng's current areas of research are complex systems and physics of machine learning. In 2002, the French Government conferred upon him the Chevalier dans l'Ordre des Palmes Academiques for his contributions to relations between the two countries within the academic field and he received the Public Administration Medal (Silver) from the Singapore Government in 2003, the Suzhou Municipal Science and Technology cooperation Award in 2014 and the Institute of Physics, Singapore (IPS) President's Award in 2015.
