= David M. Post =

Academic researcher

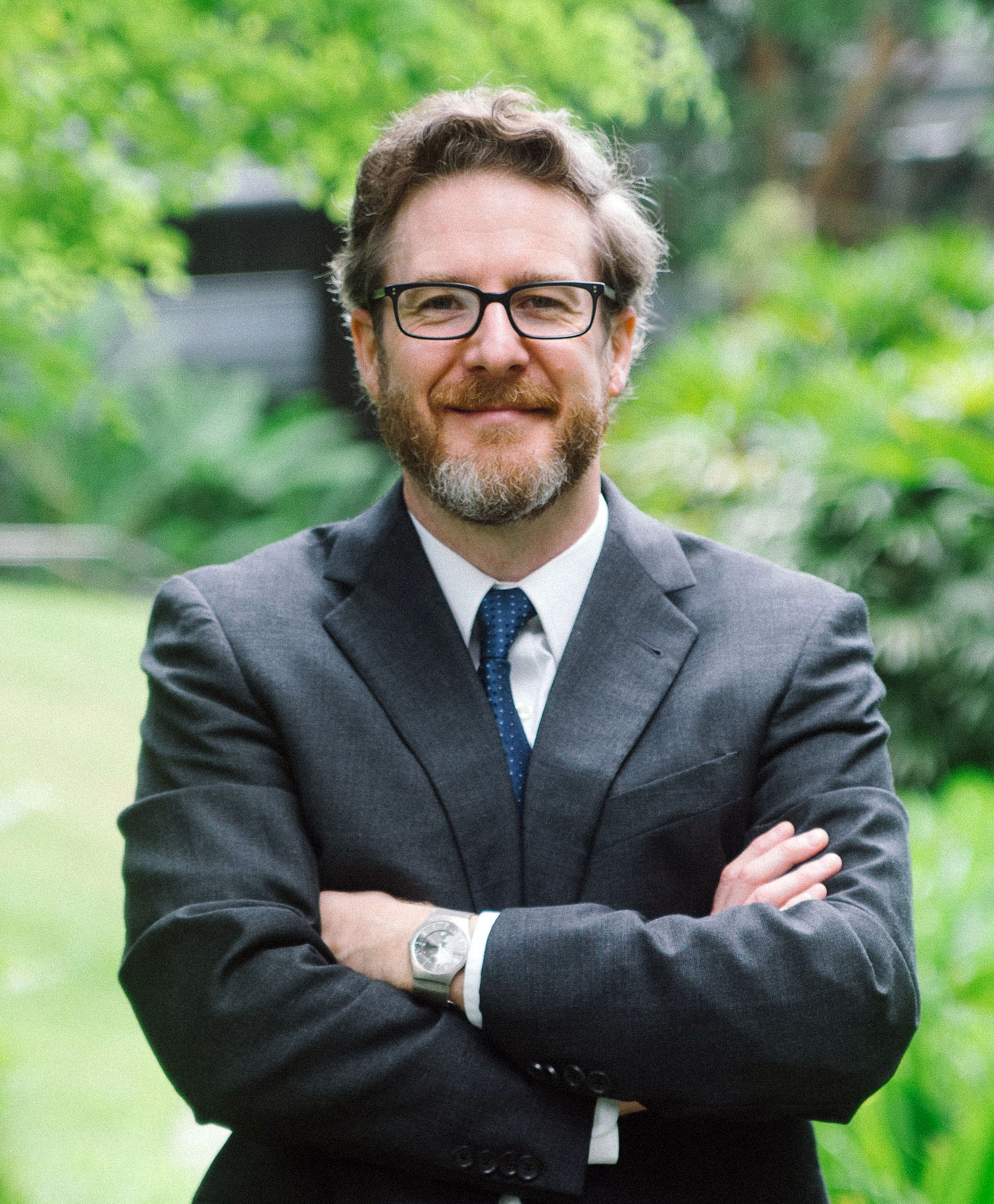
- Education: University of Wisconsin-Madison (B.S. Wildlife Ecology); University of Wisconsin-Madison (M.S. Zoology); Cornell University (Ph.D Ecology and Evolutionary Biology)
- Known for: Aquatic Ecology and Evolution, food webs, stable isotopes
- Scientific career
- Workplaces: Yale University; Yale-NUS College
- Website: https://postlab.yale.edu/

David M. Post is a research scientist and academic administrator. He is currently a professor of Ecology and Evolutionary Biology at Yale University and the Vice President (Academic Affairs)., Dean of Faculty, and Visiting Wong Ngit Liong Professor at Yale-NUS College, the first liberal arts college in Singapore. Post is an aquatic ecologist who studies food webs, evolution, and stable isotopes in lakes and rivers in Connecticut and Kenya.

He obtained his B.S. in Wildlife Ecology in 1992 and his M.S. in zoology in 1996 from University of Wisconsin-Madison, and his Ph.D. in Ecology and Evolutionary Biology from Cornell University in 2000.

== Academic career ==
Post's academic career at Yale University began in 2002 as assistant professor at the Department of Ecology and Evolutionary Biology. He was promoted to associate professor in 2008 and full Professor in 2014. During his tenure at Yale University, he served as the Director of Graduate Studies for E&EB (2010–2013), Chair of the University Wide Committee on Sexual Misconduct (2014–2018), Chair of the Head of college review committee for Timothy Dwight College (2019–2020) and chair, Natural Science Subcommittee of the Off-Campus Research and Fieldwork Review Committee (COVID oversight) (2020–2021).

He became Dean of Faculty at Yale-NUS College in 2021 and Vice President (Academic Affairs) in 2022. As part of the college's senior leadership team, Post oversees all academic programming within the college with a key focus on sustaining its curriculum, enabling faculty and student research, and encouraging student and faculty development. His priorities include maintaining excellence in teaching and research, supporting faculty, mentoring, and developing areas of distinction among the divisions and majors.

== Research ==
Post's research tests long-standing questions about food web structure and dynamics, the influence of environmental change on community structure and ecosystem function, spatial linkages among ecosystems, and the importance of interactions between ecology and evolution for community and ecosystem processes.

Post is known for his work on food-chain length and development and application of stable isotopes methods. His recent work has explored the implications of intraspecific variation and rapid evolution for ecological communities and ecosystems; and the role of wildlife in moving organic matter among ecosystems in the Maasai Mara, Kenya

In 2014, The New York Times featured his study on alewives in Connecticut lakes where he is tracking the outcome of the species' restoration at Rogers Lake. One of his notable research was the study in 2017 on how the annual mass drownings of Serengeti wildebeest can have positive impacts on the Mara River ecosystem.

== Awards and honours ==
Post received the R.H. Whittaker Award for outstanding oral presentation and Cole Award for outstanding publication from the Department of Ecology and Evolutionary Biology, Annual Symposium, Cornell University.

He earned the 2002 Raymond L. Lindeman Award from the Association for the Sciences of Limnology and Oceanography for his 2000 publication "Ecosystem size determines food-chain length in lakes" and the 2003 IRPE Prize for publishing uniquely independent, original and/or challenging research representing an important scientific breakthrough at a young age (<40 years).

Post was elected a Fellow of the American Association for the Advancement of Science (AAAS) in 2019 and a member of The Connecticut Academy of Science and Engineering in 2020.

== Notable publications ==
- Post, D.M., M.L. Pace, and N.G. Hairston Jr. 2000. Ecosystem size determines food-chain length in lakes. Nature 405:1047–1049. doi: 10.1038/35016565
- Post, D.M., M.E. Conners, and D.S. Goldberg. 2000. Prey preference by a top predator and the stability of linked food chains. Ecology 81:8–14. doi: 10.1890/0012- 9658(2000)081[0008:PPBATP]2.0.CO;2
- Post, D.M. 2002. Using stable isotopes to estimate trophic position: models, methods, and assumptions. Ecology, 83:703-718. doi: 10.1890/0012-9658(2002)083[0703:USITET]2.0.CO;2
- Post, D.M. 2003. Individual variation in the timing of ontogenetic niche shifts in largemouth bass. Ecology 84:1298–1310. doi:10.1890/0012-9658(2003)084[1298:IVITTO]2.0.CO;2
- Post, D.M., D.A. Arrington, C.A. Layman, G. Takimoto, J. Quattrochi, and C. G. Montaña. 2007. Getting to the fat of the matter: models, methods and assumptions for dealing with lipids in stable isotope analyses. Oecologia 152:179–189. doi:10.1007/s00442-006-0630-x
- Post, D.M., E.P. Palkovacs, E.G. Schielke, and S.I. Dodson. 2008. Intraspecific phenotypic variation in a predator affects zooplankton community structure and cascading trophic interactions. Ecology 89:2019–2032. doi:10.1890/07-1216.1
- Post, D.M., and E.P. Palkovacs. 2009. Eco-evolutionary feedbacks in community and ecosystem ecology: interactions between the ecological theater and the evolutionary play. Philosophical Transactions of the Royal Society B 364: 1629–1640.
- Sabo, J.L., J.C. Finlay, T. Kennedy, and D.M. Post. 2010. The role of discharge variation in scaling of drainage area and food chain length in rivers. Science 330:965–967. doi:10.1126/science.1196005
- Walsh, M.R., DeLong, J.P., Hanley, T.C., and D.M. Post. 2012. A cascade of evolutionary change alters consumer-resource dynamics and ecosystem function. Proc. R. Soc. B. 279:3184–3192 doi:10.1098/rspb.2012.0496
- Subalusky, A.L., C.L. Dutton, E.J. Rosi-Marshall, and D.M. Post. 2015. The Hippopotamus conveyor belt: vectors of carbon and nutrients from terrestrial grasslands to aquatic systems in sub-Saharan Africa. Freshwater Biology 60:512–525. doi:10.1111/fwb.12474
- Subalusky, A.L. C.L. Dutton, E.J. Rosi, and D.M. Post. 2017. Annual mass drownings of the Serengeti wildebeest migration influence nutrient cycling and storage in the Mara River. Proceedings of the National Academy of Sciences 114:7647–7652. Doi:10.1073/pnas.1614778114
- Des Roches, S., D.M. Post, N.E. Turley, J.K. Bailey, A.P. Hendry, M.T. Kinnison, J.A. Schweitzer, E.P. Palkovacs. 2018. Ecological effects of intraspecific variation. Nature Ecology and Evolution 2:57–64. Doi:10.1038/s41559-017-0402-5
- Subalusky, A.L., and D.M. Post. 2019. Context dependency of animal resource subsidies. Biological Reviews 94:517–538. doi:10.1111/brv.
