= Tan Tai Yong =

Singaporean academic

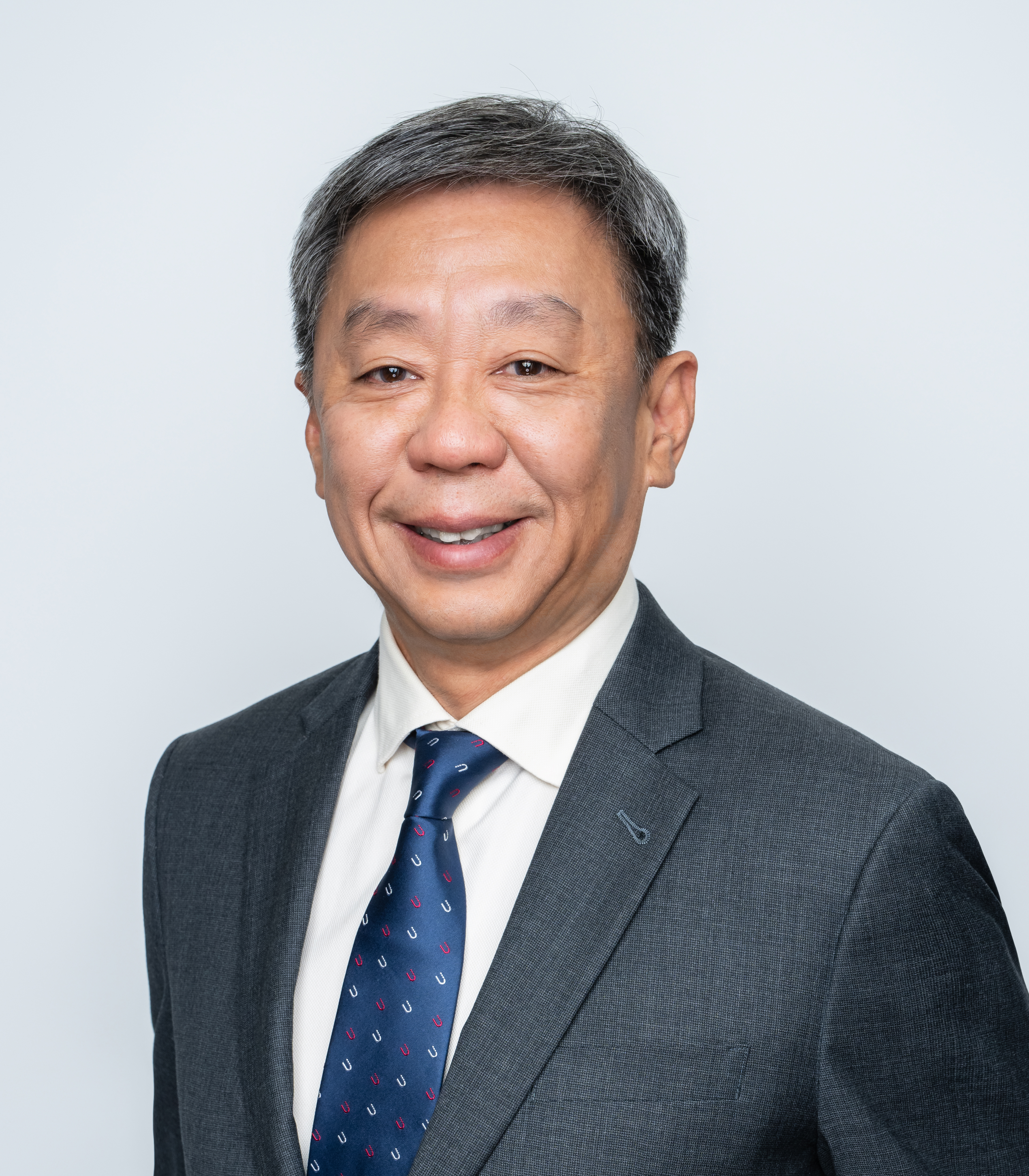
- Tan in 2023

2nd President of Singapore University of Social Sciences
- Incumbent
- Assumed office 1 January 2023
- Preceded by: Cheong Hee Kiat

Personal details
- Education: National University of Singapore (BA, MA); Cambridge University (PhD)
- Profession: Historian
- Awards: Public Service Medal (2020); Public Administration Medal (Silver) (2009); Teaching Excellence Award (1992 and 2000)

Tan Tai Yong (Chinese: 陈大荣; pinyin: Chén Dàróng) is a Singaporean academic who is the current President of Singapore University of Social Sciences. He served as the President of Yale-NUS College from 2017 to 2022. He is also Chairman of the Management Board of the Institute of South Asian Studies, an autonomous university-level research institute in NUS. He was a former Nominated Member of Parliament and served from 2014 to 2015.

== Education ==
Tan earned a Bachelor of Arts and Master of Arts from the National University of Singapore. He then earned a PhD in South Asian history from Cambridge University, under the supervision of Anthony Low.

== Career ==
Tan was a Deputy Head of the Department of History at NUS from 1998 to 1999. He also served the Faculty of Arts and Social Sciences as Sub-Dean (1994-1999), Acting Head of the Department of History (2000), Head of the History Department (2001-2003), Vice-Dean of the Faculty of Arts and Social Sciences (2001-2003), Dean of Faculty of Arts and Social Sciences (2004-2008), Vice Provost of Student Life (2010-2014) overseeing student matters, University Town and the Residential Colleges, the Centre for English Language and Communication, as well as the Office of Student Affairs and the Halls of Residence.

He was the Founding Director of the Institute of South Asian Studies, and served in this position from 2008 to 2015. He served as Co-chair of the joint Yale and National University of Singapore committee in 2011.

Tan was appointed to the Singapore Social Sciences Research Council in 2016. From August 2018 to May 2019, Professor Tan was the Institute of Policy Studies (IPS)’ 6th S R Nathan Fellow for the Study of Singapore.

He is a member of the National Library Board (NLB) and the National Heritage Board (NHB), where he is also Honorary Chairman of the National Museum, co-chair of the Founders’ Memorial Committee and Chair of the National Collection Advisory Panel.

Tan was awarded the Public Administration Medal (Silver) in 2009, and the Public Service Medal in 2020.

Tan also served as Executive Vice-President (Academic Affairs) at Yale-NUS College from 2014 to 2017, before serving as its President from 2017 to 2022.

He is currently serving as the President of Singapore University of Social Sciences since 1 January 2023.

== Research ==
Tan's research interests are in the areas of Sikh diaspora, civil-military relations, social and political history of colonial Punjab, and the partition of South Asia. Lately, he has shifted his attention to Southeast Asia, and has been exploring issues of networks formation and the place of maritime cities in the region.

== Selected publications ==
- The Idea of Singapore: Smallness Unconstrained, Singapore, 2019.
- Singapore: Seven Hundred Years – A History of Singapore, Singapore, 2019. City (with Kwa Chong Guan and Derek Heng and Peter Borschberg, 2019
- A 700 Year History of Singapore. From Classical Emporium to World City (with Kwa Chong Guan and Derek Heng), National Archives Singapore, 2009.
- Creating "Greater Malaysia": Decolonization and the Politics of Merger
- Tan Tai Yong (2005). The Garrison State: Military, Government and Society in Colonial Punjab, 1849–1947. SAGE. ISBN 978-0-7619-3336-6.
- Gyanesh Kudaisya; Tan Tai Yong (2002). The Aftermath of Partition in South Asia. Taylor & Francis. ISBN 978-0-203-45060-4.
- Beyond Degrees: The Making of the National University of Singapore (with Edwin Lee). Singapore: Singapore University Press, 1996.
- Singapore Khalsa Association. Singapore: Times Books International, 1988. (Second Edition, published by Marshall Cavendish, 2006)

== Prize and fellowship ==
Some of the prize and fellowship awards received by Tan Tai Yong includes:

- Moncado Prize for outstanding essay published in the Journal of Military History, 2001
- British Academy Visiting Professor, 2003 (attached to Wellcome Trust Centre for the History of Medicine, University College London).
- Overseas Commonwealth Fellowship and Visiting Fellow at Wolfson College and Centre for South Asian Studies, Cambridge University, 1999
- Shell Medal in History, NUS, 1986
- Straits Steamship Book Prize, 1985
- 6th S R Nathan Fellow for the Study of Singapore at the Institute of Policy Studies (Singapore).
